= A-ha discography =

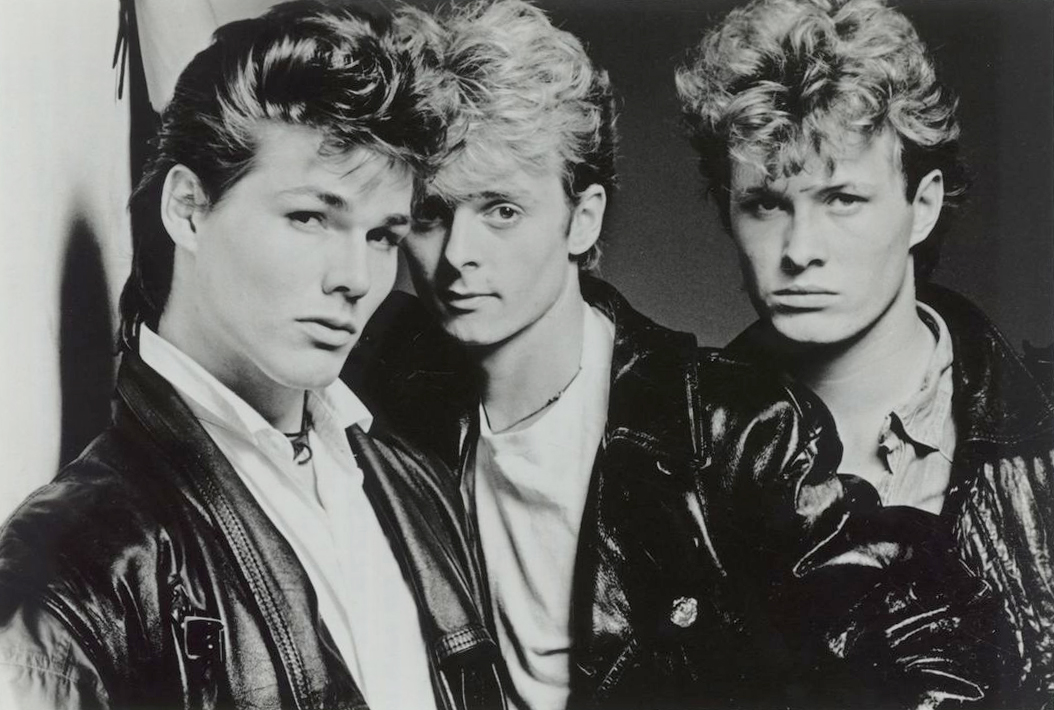
- a-ha in 1985
- Studio albums: 11
- Extended plays: 10
- Live albums: 5
- Compilation albums: 8
- Singles: 50
- Video albums: 7
- Music videos: 44
- Promotional singles: 6
- Box sets: 6
- Reissues: 9
- Demo Tapes: 1

The discography of A-ha, a Norwegian synth-pop band, consists of eleven studio albums, eight compilation albums, six box sets, ten extended plays, and fifty singles. This list does not include solo material or other projects recorded by A-ha band members.

A-ha was formed in 1982 by vocalist Morten Harket, guitarist Paul Waaktaar-Savoy, and keyboardist Magne Furuholmen. The band moved to London and eventually signed with Warner Bros. Records. They released their debut album Hunting High and Low in 1985, which remains their biggest success and contained their international break-through hit song "Take On Me". The band has scored two top twenty US hits in their career, but has had several hit singles in many countries in Europe, South America and their native Norway. By 1993, the band had released five studio albums before going on hiatus the following year.

After a performance at the Nobel Peace Prize Concert in 1998, the band returned to the studio and recorded a new album, Minor Earth Major Sky, which was released in 2000. Their next album, Lifelines, was released in 2002, but would be their final album for Warner Bros. After signing to Polydor (part of Universal Music), further new albums were released in 2005 and 2009, after which the band decided to break up. However, they reformed for yet another new album, Cast in Steel, which was released in 2015. In 2022 they signed a one-album deal with RCA/Sony Music and released the True North album in 2022. Harket, Furuholmen and Waaktaar-Savoy have been awarded Spellemannprisen 8 times. Through 2009 A-ha had sold over 100 million records worldwide. The band has released eleven studio albums, five compilations and four live albums.

In their native Norway, eight of the band's studio albums and eight of their singles have reached number one.

== Albums ==
=== Studio albums ===
Title	Album details	Peak chart positions											Certifications
Title	Album details	NOR	AUS	AUT	FRA	GER	JPN	NL	SWE	SWI	UK	US	Certifications
Hunting High and Low	Released: 1 June 1985; Label: Warner Bros.; Formats: CD, LP, MC	1	15	1	7	10	8	11	1	10	2	15	NOR: 2× Platinum; AUS: Gold; GER: 3× Gold; NL: Gold; UK: 3× Platinum; US: Platinum
Scoundrel Days	Released: 6 October 1986; Label: Warner Bros.; Formats: CD, LP, MC	1	17	9	7	4	6	6	11	6	2	74	NOR: 2× Platinum; GER: Platinum; SWI: Platinum; UK: 2× Platinum
Stay on These Roads	Released: 3 May 1988; Label: Warner Bros.; Formats: CD, LP, MC	1	55	9	3	4	5	5	10	6	2	148	GER: Gold; NL: Gold; SWI: Gold; UK: Gold
East of the Sun, West of the Moon	Released: 22 October 1990; Label: Warner Bros.; Formats: CD, LP, MC	1	122	23	15	6	20	20	35	16	12	—	GER: Gold; SWI: Gold; UK: Silver
Memorial Beach	Released: 14 June 1993; Label: Warner Bros.; Formats: CD, LP, MC	1	132	36	25	17	27	64	39	39	17	—	
Minor Earth Major Sky	Released: 17 July 2000; Label: WEA; Formats: CD, MC	1	169	4	41	1	53	55	36	3	27	—	GER: Platinum; SWI: Gold
Lifelines	Released: 24 April 2002; Label: WEA; Formats: CD, MC	1	—	2	30	1	99	92	21	6	67	—	GER: Gold
Analogue	Released: 4 November 2005; Label: Polydor; Formats: CD, MC, digital download	1	—	18	60	6	—	50	—	21	24	—	UK: Silver
Foot of the Mountain	Released: 19 June 2009; Label: We Love Music/Polydor/Universal; Formats: CD, digital download	2	—	11	—	1	134	83	45	12	5	—	GER: Platinum
Cast in Steel	Released: 4 September 2015; Label: We Love Music/Polydor/Universal; Formats: CD, 2×CD, LP, digital download	2	—	13	84	4	—	5	—	9	8	—	
True North	Released: 21 October 2022; Label: RCA; Formats: CD, LP, digital download	3	—	8	38	4	39	11	6	5	12	—	
"—" denotes releases that did not chart or were not released in that territory.

=== Live albums ===
Title	Album details	Peak chart positions							
Title	Album details	NOR	AUT	FRA	GER	NL	SPA	SWI	UK
Live at Vallhall: Homecoming	Released: 5 November 2001; Label: Self-released; Formats: DVD+CD, VHS+CD; CD only available as a bonus with the video album from the band's website	—	—	—	—	—	—	—	—
How Can I Sleep with Your Voice in My Head	Released: 24 March 2003; Label: WEA; Formats: CD, 2×CD, MC	4	73	88	8	—	—	36	—
Live at Vallhall – Sight & Sound series CD & DVD set	Released: 28 July 2008; Label: Warner Music; Formats: CD+DVD; Reissue of 2001 album with full live CD	—	—	—	—	—	—	—	—
Ending on a High Note: The Final Concert	Released: 1 April 2011; Label: We Love Music/Universal; Formats: CD, DVD, Blu-ray	3	61	163	3	72	92	52	43
MTV Unplugged: Summer Solstice	Released: 6 October 2017; Label: We Love Music/Polydor/Universal; Formats: 2×CD, 3×LP, DVD, Blu-ray, digital download	14	14	100	3	98	76	20	6
"—" denotes releases that did not chart or were not released in that territory.

=== Compilation albums ===
Title	Album details	Peak chart positions										Certifications
Title	Album details	NOR	AUS	AUT	GER	IRE	JPN	NL	SWE	SWI	UK	Certifications
On Tour in Brazil	Released: 1989; Label: WEA; Formats: CD, LP, MC; Brazil-only release	—	—	—	—	—	—	—	—	—	—	BRZ: 641,000 Sales (NOPEM); #1 Brazil (NOPEM)
Best in Brazil (a.k.a. a-ha en Argentina)	Released: 1991; Label: WEA; Formats: CD, LP, MC; Brazil and Argentina-only release	—	—	—	—	—	—	—	—	—	—	
Headlines and Deadlines: The Hits of A-ha	Released: 4 November 1991; Label: Warner Bros.; Formats: CD, LP, MC	8	162	32	26	18	16	28	47	40	12	GER: Platinum; JPN: Gold; UK: Platinum
The Very Best of a-ha	Released: 13 May 1992; Label: Music Design/Afidno; Formats: CD, LP, MC; South Korea-only release	—	—	—	—	—	—	—	—	—	—	
The Singles: 1984–2004	Released: 11 April 2005; Label: Warner Music; Formats: CD, digital download; Released in the UK as The Definitive Singles Collection 1984–2004	4	—	—	49	44	—	—	8	—	14	GER: Gold; UK: Gold
25	Released: 19 July 2010; Label: Warner Bros./Rhino; Formats: 2×CD, digital download	6	—	9	2	28	—	73	—	6	10	NOR: 2× Platinum; GER: Platinum; UK: Silver
Time and Again: The Ultimate a-ha	Released: 18 March 2016; Label: Warner Bros./Rhino; Formats: 2×CD, digital download	—	—	—	22	—	—	—	—	38	75	
Greatest Hits – Japanese Singles Collection	Released: 26 February 2020; Label: Warner Music Japan/Rhino; Formats: CD+DVD; Japan-only release	—	—	—	—	—	44	—	—	—	—	
"—" denotes releases that did not chart or were not released in that territory.

=== Box sets ===
Title	Album details
Minor Earth Major Box	Released: 26 February 2001; Label: WEA; Formats: 4×CDS
3 for One	Released: 2 October 2001; Label: Warner Music; Formats: 3×CD; Australia-only release
Trilogy: Three Classic Albums	Released: 5 December 2005; Label: Warner Bros./Rhino; Formats: 3×CD
Original Album Series	Released: 13 June 2011; Label: Warner Bros.; Formats: 5×CD
2 for 1: Foot of the Mountain/Analogue	Released: 28 October 2011; Label: Universal Music; Formats: 2×CD
The Triple Album Collection	Released: 5 October 2012; Label: Warner Bros.; Formats: 3×CD

=== Reissues ===
Title	Album details	Peak chart positions				
Title	Album details	NOR	GER	NL	JPN	UK
Hunting High and Low (Deluxe Edition)	Released: 5 July 2010; Label: Warner Bros./Rhino; Formats: 2×CD, digital download	32	39	—	160	165
Scoundrel Days (Deluxe Edition)	Released: 5 July 2010; Label: Warner Bros./Rhino; Formats: 2×CD, digital download	27	52	—	190	190
Hunting High and Low Super Deluxe 30th Anniversary Edition	Released: 18 September 2015; Label: Warner Bros./Rhino; Formats: 4×CD+DVD, CD, LP, digital download	25	30	79	—	83
Stay on These Roads (Deluxe Edition)	Released: 23 October 2015; Label: Warner Bros./Rhino; Formats: 2×CD, digital download	—	—	—	—	145
East of the Sun, West of the Moon (Deluxe Edition)	Released: 23 October 2015; Label: Warner Bros./Rhino; Formats: 2×CD+DVD, digital download	—	—	—	—	186
Memorial Beach (Deluxe Edition)	Released: 23 October 2015; Label: Warner Bros./Rhino; Formats: 2×CD, digital download	—	—	—	—	184
Minor Earth Major Sky (Deluxe Edition)	Released: 27 September 2019; Label: Warner Music/Rhino; Formats: 2×CD, 2×LP, digital download	35	62	—	—	—
Lifelines (Deluxe Edition)	Released: 27 September 2019; Label: Warner Music/Rhino; Formats: 2×CD, 2×LP, digital download	—	68	—	—	—
Hunting High and Low (Expanded Edition)	Released: 15 November 2019; Label: Warner Bros./Rhino; Formats: 4×CD, digital download	—	—	—	—	—
Analogue (Deluxe Edition)	Released: 17 April 2026; Label: Warner Bros./Rhino; Formats: 2×CD, digital download	—	—	—	—	—
"—" denotes releases that did not chart or were not released in that territory.

== EPs ==
Title	EP details	Peak chart positions
Title	EP details	JPN
45 R.P.M. Club	Released: 25 June 1986; Label: Warner Bros./Reprise; Formats: 12", CD, MC; Japan-only release	6
Twelve Inch Club	Released: 25 August 1986; Label: Warner Bros./Reprise; Formats: 12", CD, MC; Japan-only release	21
a-ha	Released: 1986; Label: Amiga; Formats: 7"; East Germany-only release	—
Scoundrel Club	Released: 25 May 1987; Label: Warner Bros.; Formats: 12", CD, MC; Japan-only release	27
Road Club	Released: 25 August 1988; Label: Warner Bros.; Formats: CD; Japan-only release	42
Hits E.P.	Released: 1 October 1990; Label: Warner Bros.; Formats: 7"; UK-only release	—
Hits E.P. – Number Two	Released: December 1990; Label: Warner Bros.; Formats: 7"; UK-only release	—
Singles Remixies	Released: 8 November 2000; Label: WEA; Formats: CD; Japan-only release	—
Rhino Hi-Five	Released: 19 July 2005; Label: Rhino; Formats: digital download	—
Hits South America	Released: 16 April 2016; Label: Warner Bros./Rhino; Formats: 12"	—
"—" denotes releases that did not chart or were not released in that territory.

== Singles ==
Title	Year	Peak chart positions										Certifications	Album
Title	Year	NOR	AUS	AUT	FRA	GER	IRE	NL	SWI	UK	US	Certifications	Album
"Take On Me" (original version) (Note: The original 1984 single version of "Take On Me" would later appear on the Deluxe Edition of the album Hunting High and Low.)	1984	3	—	—	—	—	—	—	—	—	—		Non-album single
"Love Is Reason"	1985	—	—	—	—	—	—	—	—	—	—		Hunting High and Low
"Take On Me"	1985	1	1	1	3	1	2	1	1	2	1	FRA: Gold; GER: Gold; RMNZ: 6× Platinum; UK: 5× Platinum	Hunting High and Low
"The Sun Always Shines on T.V."	1985	2	19	8	10	5	1	4	7	1	20	UK: Gold	Hunting High and Low
"Train of Thought"	1986	—	47	—	—	14	5	—	—	8	—		Hunting High and Low
"Hunting High and Low"	1986	10	33	24	4	11	4	9	—	5	—		Hunting High and Low
"I've Been Losing You"	1986	1	21	20	14	15	3	11	16	8	—		Scoundrel Days
"Cry Wolf"	1986	2	45	—	35	20	4	12	27	5	50	UK: Silver	Scoundrel Days
"Maybe Maybe" (Bolivia-only release)	1986	—	—	—	—	—	—	—	—	—	—		Scoundrel Days
"Manhattan Skyline"	1987	4	—	—	—	28	3	53	—	13	—		Scoundrel Days
"The Living Daylights" (Note: "The Living Daylights" was the theme song for the 1987 James Bond film The Living Daylights. A re-recorded version of the song would appear on A-ha's 1988 studio album Stay on These Roads.)	1987	1	29	18	21	8	3	9	8	5	—		The Living Daylights (soundtrack)
"Stay on These Roads"	1988	1	56	11	3	7	2	10	10	5	—		Stay on These Roads
"The Blood That Moves the Body"	1988	—	—	—	—	23	11	24	29	25	—		Stay on These Roads
"Touchy!"	1988	—	—	—	5	13	6	13	18	11	—		Stay on These Roads
"You Are the One"	1988	—	—	—	21	30	12	56	—	13	—		Stay on These Roads
"Crying in the Rain"	1990	1	131	17	11	6	8	10	21	13	—		East of the Sun, West of the Moon
"I Call Your Name"	1990	—	155	—	45	37	—	38	—	44	—		East of the Sun, West of the Moon
"Early Morning"	1991	—	—	—	—	52	29	—	—	78	—		East of the Sun, West of the Moon
"Waiting for Her" (Japan-only release)	1991	—	—	—	—	—	—	—	—	—	—		East of the Sun, West of the Moon
"Move to Memphis" (Note: "Move to Memphis" was released as a single from the 1991 compilation Headlines and Deadlines – The Hits of A-ha. A new version of the song would appear on A-ha's 1993 studio album Memorial Beach.)	1991	2	171	—	—	39	29	61	—	47	—		Headlines and Deadlines – The Hits of a-ha
"The Blood That Moves the Body '92" (Note: "The Blood That Moves the Body (The Gun Mix)" was a new remixed version of the song released as a single to promote the compilation Headlines and Deadlines – The Hits of A-ha, though it wasn't included on the album. The B-side of this single, the 'Two-Time Gun Mix', appeared on the 2010 compilation album 25.)	1992	—	—	—	—	—	—	—	—	90	—		Non-album single
"Dark Is the Night for All"	1993	4	165	—	—	46	28	—	—	19	— (Note: "Dark Is the Night for All" did not enter the Billboard Hot 100, but peaked at number 11 on the Bubbling Under Hot 100 Singles chart.)		Memorial Beach
"Angel"	1993	—	—	—	—	—	—	—	—	41	—		Memorial Beach
"Lie Down in Darkness" (US-only release)	1993	—	—	—	—	—	—	—	—	—	—		Memorial Beach
"Shapes That Go Together"	1994	—	—	—	—	57	—	—	—	27	—		Non-album single
"Summer Moved On"	2000	1	—	10	—	8	—	74	14	33	—		Minor Earth Major Sky
"Minor Earth Major Sky"	2000	23	—	—	—	73	—	—	73	—	—		Minor Earth Major Sky
"Velvet"	2000	29	—	—	—	48	—	—	92	—	—		Minor Earth Major Sky
"The Sun Never Shone That Day"	2000	—	—	—	—	—	—	—	—	—	—		Minor Earth Major Sky
"Forever Not Yours"	2002	1	—	31	—	18	—	82	26	175	—		Lifelines
"Lifelines"	2002	18	—	—	—	32	—	—	—	78	—		Lifelines
"Did Anyone Approach You?"	2002	—	—	—	—	67	—	—	—	—	—		Lifelines
"The Sun Always Shines on T.V." (live)	2003	27	—	—	—	53	—	—	—	181	—		How Can I Sleep with Your Voice in My Head
"Celice"	2005	1	—	41	—	21	—	—	38	—	—		Analogue
"Birthright"	2005	—	—	—	—	—	—	—	—	—	—		Analogue
"Analogue (All I Want)"	2006	10	—	—	—	33	24	—	—	10	—		Analogue
"Cosy Prisons"	2006	—	—	—	—	—	—	—	—	39	—		Analogue
"Foot of the Mountain"	2009	8	—	28	—	3	—	—	33	66	—	GER: Gold	Foot of the Mountain
"Nothing Is Keeping You Here"	2009	—	—	—	—	65	—	—	—	—	—		Foot of the Mountain
"Shadowside"	2009	—	—	73	—	22	—	—	—	—	—		Foot of the Mountain
"Butterfly, Butterfly (The Last Hurrah)"	2010	13	—	—	—	22	—	—	—	98	—		25
"Summer Moved On" (live)	2011	—	—	—	—	90	—	—	—	—	—		Ending on a High Note: The Final Concert
"Under the Makeup"	2015	—	—	—	—	—	—	—	—	—	—		Cast in Steel
"Cast in Steel" (Steve Osborne version)	2016	—	—	—	—	—	—	—	—	—	—		Cast in Steel
"Objects in the Mirror" (Steve Osborne version)	2016	—	—	—	179	—	—	—	—	—	—		Cast in Steel
"This Is Our Home"	2017	—	—	—	—	—	—	—	—	—	—		MTV Unplugged
"I'm In"	2022	—	—	—	—	—	—	—	—	— (Note: "I'm In" did not enter the Official Singles Chart Top 100, but peaked at number 52 on the Official Singles Sales Chart.)	—		True North
"You Have What It Takes"	2022	—	—	—	—	—	—	—	—	—	—		True North
"—" denotes releases that did not chart or were not released in that territory.

=== Promotional singles ===
Title	Year	Album
"Living a Boy's Adventure Tale" (Philippines-only release)	1986	Hunting High and Low
"There's Never a Forever Thing" (Brazil-only release)	1989	Stay on These Roads
"Birthright"	2005	Analogue
"The Wake"	2015	Cast in Steel
"Forest Fire"	2015	Cast in Steel
"Cry Wolf" (Jellybean Mix)	2016	Time and Again: The Ultimate a-ha

== Videos ==
=== Video albums ===
Title	Album details	Peak chart positions				
Title	Album details	AUT	NL	SWE	SWI	UK
Headlines and Deadlines – The Hits of a-ha	Released: November 1991; Label: Warner Music Vision; Formats: VHS, LD	—	—	—	—	8
Live in South America	Released: June 1993; Label: Warner Music Vision; Formats: VHS, LD	—	—	—	—	7
Live at Vallhall: Homecoming	Released: 5 November 2001; Label: Warner Music Vision; Formats: DVD, VHS	—	—	—	—	13
2-DVD Collection	Released: 27 November 2006; Label: Warner Music Vision; Formats: 2×DVD	—	—	—	—	—
25	Released: 19 July 2010; Label: Warner Bros./Rhino; Formats: 2×CD+DVD	—	—	—	—	—
Ending on a High Note: The Final Concert	Released: 1 April 2011; Label: We Love Music/Universal; Formats: DVD, Blu-ray	1	11	1	4	—
MTV Unplugged: Summer Solstice	Released: 6 October 2017; Label: We Love Music/Polydor/Universal; Formats: DVD, Blu-ray	5	8	11	9	—
A-ha – The Movie (documentary)	Released: 3 September 2021; Label: Motlys Film- og TV-produksjon; Formats: DVD, Blu-ray					1

"—" denotes releases that did not chart or were not released in that territory.

=== Music videos ===
List of music videos, showing year released and directors
Title	Year	Director
"Take On Me" (original version)	1984	Stevie Price
"Take On Me"	1985	Steve Barron
"The Sun Always Shines on T.V."	1985	Steve Barron
"Train of Thought"	1985	Candice Reckinger & Michael Patterson
Hunting High and Low"	1986	Steve Barron
"I've Been Losing You"	1986	Steve Barron
"Cry Wolf"	1986	Steve Barron
"Manhattan Skyline"	1987	Steve Barron
"The Living Daylights"	1987	Steve Barron
"Stay on These Roads"	1988	Andy Morahan
"The Blood That Moves the Body"	1988	Andy Morahan
"Touchy!"	1988	Kevin Moloney
"You Are the One"	1988	Damon Heath
"There's Never a Forever Thing"	1988	Lauren Savoy
"Crying in the Rain"	1990	Steve Barron
"I Call Your Name"	1990	Michael Burlingame
"Early Morning"	1991	Michael Burlingame
"I've Been Losing You" (live)	1991	Odd Arvid Strømstad
"Sycamore Leaves" (live)	1991	Odd Arvid Strømstad
"Move to Memphis"	1991	Erick Ifergan
"Dark Is the Night for All"	1993	Erick Ifergan
"Angel in the Snow"	1993	Howard Greenhalgh
"Shapes That Go Together"	1994	Barry Maguire
"Summer Moved On"	2000	Adam Berg
"Minor Earth Major Sky"	2000	Philipp Stölzl
"I Wish I Cared"	2000	Henrik Haugen
"Velvet"	2000	Harald Zwart
"The Sun Never Shone That Day"	2000	Trond Kvernstrøm, John Sullivan, Per Sundnes and Odd Syse
"Forever Not Yours"	2002	Harald Zwart
"Lifelines"	2002	Morten Skallerud
"Did Anyone Approach You?"	2003	Lauren Savoy
"The Sun Always Shines on T.V." (live)	2003	Lauren Savoy
"Celice"	2005	Jörn Heitmann
"Analogue (All I Want)"	2006	Howard Greenhalgh
"Cosy Prisons"	2006	Paul Gore
"Foot of the Mountain"	2009	Olaf Heine
"Shadowside"	2009	Uwe Flade
"Nothing Is Keeping You Here"	2009	Uwe Flade
"Butterfly, Butterfly (The Last Hurrah)"	2010	Steve Barron
"Summer Moved On" (live)	2011	N/A
"Under the Makeup"	2015	Bode Brodmüller
"Cast in Steel"	2016	
"Objects in the Mirror"	2016	Jonas Bjerre
"I'm In"	2022	Stian Andersen
"You Have What It Takes"	2022	Stian Andersen
"As If"	2022	Stian Andersen
"True North"	2022	Stian Andersen
"Hunter in the Hills"	2022	Stian Andersen
"Between the Halo and the Horn"	2023	Stian Andersen

== Demo tapes ==
Title	Album details
The Swing of Things / The Demo Tapes	Released Officially: 21 October 2004; Released in Bootlegs: mid 1980s; Recorded in 1982 and 1983; Label: Forlaget Press; Formats: CD
