= 25 (A-ha album) =

Greatest hits album by A-ha
- Released: 19 July 2010
- Recorded: 1985–2010
- Genres: Synth-pop; new wave; pop rock; alternative rock
- Labels: Warner Bros.; Rhino
- Producers: Bill Inglot; various

A-ha chronology
| Foot of the Mountain (2009) | 25 (2010) | Ending on a High Note: The Final Concert (2011) |

Singles from 25
- 1. "Butterfly, Butterfly (The Last Hurrah)" Released: 5 July 2010

25 is a greatest hits album by Norwegian synth-pop band A-ha. It was released in Norway on 19 July 2010, in Germany and central Europe on 6 August, and in the United Kingdom and other parts of Europe on 4 October. 25 includes all 33 of the band's singles (excluding the promo singles "I Wish I Cared", "Birthright", "Waiting for Her", "Lie Down in Darkness", "Maybe, Maybe" and "Love Is Reason", as well as the original 1988 single "The Blood That Moves the Body" and the 2003 live version of "The Sun Always Shines on T.V."), along with five album tracks and the B-side "Cold as Stone" (remix).

The album includes the single "Butterfly, Butterfly (The Last Hurrah)" which had the world premiere on 14 June 2010 and was made available as a digital download on 9 July. The Japanese version features a different track list, with three tracks chosen by the Japanese public. This compilation is far more comprehensive than either of the two previous compilations (Headlines and Deadlines – The Hits of A-ha and The Definitive Singles Collection 1984–2004).

== Track listings ==
=== Compilation ===
Disc One

1. "Take on Me" – 3:49 from Hunting High and Low
2. "The Blue Sky" – 2:36 from Hunting High and Low
3. "The Sun Always Shines on T.V." – 5:08 from Hunting High and Low
4. "Train of Thought" (7" remix) – 4:15 from Hunting High and Low
5. "Hunting High and Low" (7" remix) – 3:48 from Hunting High and Low
6. "I've Been Losing You" – 4:26 from Scoundrel Days
7. "Scoundrel Days" – 4:00 from Scoundrel Days
8. "The Swing of Things" – 4:15 from Scoundrel Days
9. "Cry Wolf" – 4:06 from Scoundrel Days
10. "Manhattan Skyline" (edit version) – 4:21 from Scoundrel Days
11. "The Living Daylights" – 4:12 from the soundtrack to The Living Daylights
12. "Stay on These Roads" – 4:46 from Stay on These Roads
13. "Touchy!" (UK DJ edit) – 3:38 from Stay on These Roads
14. "There's Never a Forever Thing" – 2:51 from Stay on These Roads
15. "You Are the One" (7" remix) – 3:50 from Stay on These Roads
16. "The Blood That Moves the Body" (Two-Time Gun Remix) – 4:08 from Stay on These Roads
17. "Crying in the Rain" – 4:21 from East of the Sun, West of the Moon
18. "Early Morning" – 2:59 from East of the Sun, West of the Moon
19. "Slender Frame" – 3:43 from East of the Sun, West of the Moon
20. "I Call Your Name" (special DJ edit) – 4:29 from East of the Sun, West of the Moon

Disc Two

1. "Move to Memphis" (single version) – 4:17 from Headlines and Deadlines: The Hits of A-ha
2. "Dark Is the Night for All" – 3:45 from Memorial Beach
3. "Cold as Stone" (remix) – 4:33 from Memorial Beach
4. "Angel in the Snow" (edit) – 4:07 from Memorial Beach
5. "Shapes That Go Together" – 4:14 Single release only
6. "Summer Moved On" – 4:37 from Minor Earth Major Sky
7. "Minor Earth Major Sky" (Niven's radio edit) – 4:02 from Minor Earth Major Sky
8. "The Sun Never Shone That Day" (radio edit) – 3:31 from Minor Earth Major Sky
9. "Velvet" – 4:20 from Minor Earth Major Sky
10. "Forever Not Yours" – 4:06 from Lifelines
11. "Lifelines" – 4:17 from Lifelines
12. "Did Anyone Approach You?" – 4:11 from Lifelines
13. "Celice" – 3:40 from Analogue
14. "Analogue (All I Want)" – 3:49 from Analogue
15. "Cosy Prisons" (radio mix) – 3:58 from Analogue
16. "Foot of the Mountain" – 3:57 from Foot of the Mountain
17. "Nothing Is Keeping You Here" (single remix) – 3:05 from Foot of the Mountain
18. "Shadowside" (single edit) – 3:31 from Foot of the Mountain
19. "Butterfly, Butterfly (The Last Hurrah)" – 4:10 previously unreleased
- "Hunting High and Low" (slow version demo) – 3:45 (German Amazon.de bonus track)
- "Butterfly, Butterfly (The Last Hurrah)" (Steve Osborne Version) – 4:28 (iTunes Deluxe Edition bonus track)

=== DVD (25: The Videos) ===
1. "Take On Me" (1985 version)
2. "The Sun Always Shines On T.V."
3. "I`ve Been Losing You" (original version)
4. "Manhattan Skyline"
5. "Stay On These Roads"
6. "Crying In The Rain" (alternate cut)
7. "Dark Is The Night For All" ("banned" version)
8. "Move To Memphis"
9. "Shapes That Go Together"
10. "Angel In The Snow"
11. "Summer Moved On"
12. "Minor Earth, Major Sky"
13. "Lifelines"
14. "Did Anyone Approach You?"
15. "Velvet" (European Cut, a.k.a. "Licking version")
16. "Butterfly, Butterfly (The Last Hurrah)"

Bonus video

1. "Take On Me" (1984 version)

=== Japanese track listing ===
The Japanese version features a shortened track list sequenced out of chronological order, however it does include seven tracks not included in the international version (indicated by a *):

CD1

1. "Take on Me"
2. "Hunting High and Low" (7" remix)
3. "Stay on These Roads"
4. "Foot of the Mountain"
5. "The Sun Always Shines on T.V."
6. "I've Been Losing You"
7. "Summer Moved On"
8. "Crying in the Rain"
9. "Analogue"
10. "Manhattan Skyline" (edit version)
11. "The Swing of Things"
12. "Scoundrel Days"
13. "Rolling Thunder" *
14. "And You Tell Me" *
15. "You Are the One" (7" remix)
16. "The Blue Sky"
17. "The Living Daylights"
18. "Lifelines"
19. "Living a Boy's Adventure Tale" *

CD2

1. "Velvet"
2. "Angel in the Snow" (edit)
3. "Shadowside" (single edit)
4. "Train of Thought" (7" remix)
5. "Out of Blue Comes Green" *
6. "Dark Is the Night for All"
7. "Waiting for Her" *
8. "Here I Stand and Face the Rain" *
9. "The Blood That Moves the Body" (Two-Time Gun remix)
10. "Minor Earth Major Sky" (Niven's radio edit)
11. "Cry Wolf"
12. "The Weight of the Wind" *
13. "Slender Frame"
14. "Move to Memphis" (single version)
15. "Touchy!" (UK DJ edit)
16. "I Call Your Name"
17. "Shapes That Go Together"
18. "Butterfly, Butterfly (The Last Hurrah)"

== Charts ==
=== Weekly charts ===
| Chart (2010) | Peak position |
|---|---|
| Austrian Albums (Ö3 Austria) | 9 |
| Belgian Albums (Ultratop Flanders) | 87 |
| Belgian Albums (Ultratop Wallonia) | 35 |
| Danish Albums (Hitlisten) | 27 |
| Dutch Albums (Album Top 100) | 73 |
| European Albums (Billboard) | 8 |
| German Albums (Offizielle Top 100) | 2 |
| Hungarian Albums (MAHASZ) | 34 |
| Irish Albums (IRMA) | 28 |
| Japanese Albums (Oricon) | 203 |
| Norwegian Albums (VG-lista) | 6 |
| Scottish Albums (Official Charts) | 13 |
| Spanish Albums (Promusicae) | 55 |
| Swiss Albums (Schweizer Hitparade) | 6 |
| UK Albums (Official Charts) | 10 |

=== Year-end charts ===
| Chart (2010) | Position |
|---|---|
| European Albums (Billboard) | 76 |
| German Albums (Offizielle Top 100) | 19 |

== Certifications ==
| Region | Certification | Certified units/sales |
|---|---|---|
| Germany (BVMI) | Platinum | 200,000^{^} |
| Norway (IFPI Norway) | 2× Platinum | 60,000^{*} |
| United Kingdom (BPI) | Silver | 60,000^{^} |
^{*} Sales figures based on certification alone.^{^} Shipments figures based on certification alone.
