= Time and Again: The Ultimate A-ha =

Greatest hits album by A-ha
- Released: 18 March 2016
- Recorded: 1984–2015
- Genre: New wave; synth-pop
- Label: Rhino

A-ha chronology
Cast in Steel (2015)	Time and Again: The Ultimate A-ha (2016)	MTV Unplugged – Summer Solstice (2017)

Time and Again: The Ultimate A-ha is a greatest hits album by Norwegian synth-pop band A-ha. It was released on 18 March 2016 by Rhino Records. The album spawned three singles: "Cry Wolf" (Jellybean mix), "Did Anyone Approach You?" (reamped) and "You Are the One" (dub mix edit).

== Track listing ==
Disc one: Hits
No.	Title	Originally from	Length
1.	"Take On Me"	Hunting High and Low	3:47
2.	"The Sun Always Shines on T.V."	Hunting High and Low	5:06
3.	"Hunting High and Low"	Hunting High and Low	3:47
4.	"I've Been Losing You"	Scoundrel Days	4:24
5.	"Cry Wolf"	Scoundrel Days	4:06
6.	"Manhattan Skyline"	Scoundrel Days	4:47
7.	"The Living Daylights"	Stay on These Roads	4:14
8.	"Stay on These Roads"	Stay on These Roads	4:48
9.	"You Are the One"	Stay on These Roads	3:45
10.	"Crying in the Rain"	East of the Sun, West of the Moon	4:23
11.	"Move to Memphis"	Memorial Beach	4:15
12.	"Dark Is the Night for All"	Memorial Beach	3:45
13.	"Summer Moved On"	Minor Earth Major Sky	4:37
14.	"Forever Not Yours"	Lifelines	4:03
15.	"Lifelines"	Lifelines	4:15
16.	"Celice"	Analogue	3:40
17.	"Analogue (All I Want)"	Analogue	3:49
18.	"Foot of the Mountain"	Foot of the Mountain	3:56
19.	"Under the Makeup"	Cast in Steel	3:22

Disc two: Remixed
No.	Title	Remixer(s)	Length
1.	"Take on Me" (Kygo Remix)	Kygo	3:45
2.	"The Sun Always Shines on T.V." (Future Funk Squad's 'Radiant 4K' remix)	Glen Nicholls	5:38
3.	"Cry Wolf" (Jellybean mix)	John "Jellybean" Benitez	5:14
4.	"Touchy!" (House mix)	Paul Simpson	5:21
5.	"You Are the One" (Dub mix edit)	Justin Strauss	5:21
6.	"The Blood That Moves the Body" (Three-Time Gun mix)	Alan Tarney	5:10
7.	"Summer Moved On" (Remix)	Boogieman, Roland Spremberg	6:00
8.	"Minor Earth Major Sky" (Black Dog mix)	Island Brothers, R.A.S.	4:07
9.	"Velvet" (New York mix)	John Agnello	5:18
10.	"Lifelines" (Boogieman remix)	Andreas Herbig	4:53
11.	"Did Anyone Approach You?" (Reamped)	Achim Lindermeir	4:51
12.	"Celice" (Mauracher remix)	Martin Terefe	3:56
13.	"Analogue" (CG's Electrosphere edit)	Christian Geller	4:09
14.	"Cosy Prisons" (Aural Float remix)	Aural Float	5:48
15.	"Foot of the Mountain" (Erik Ljunggren remix)	Erik Ljunggren	4:49
16.	"Butterfly, Butterfly (The Last Hurrah)" (Steve Osborne version)	Steve Osborne	4:27

== Charts ==
Chart (2016)	Peak position
Belgian Albums (Ultratop Flanders)	155
Belgian Albums (Ultratop Wallonia)	96
Czech Albums (ČNS IFPI)	43
German Albums (Offizielle Top 100)	22
Hungarian Albums (MAHASZ)	25
Scottish Albums (OCC)	60
Swiss Albums (Schweizer Hitparade)	38
UK Albums (OCC)	75
