= Headlines and Deadlines: The Hits of A-ha =

Greatest hits album by A-ha
- Released: 4 November 1991
- Recorded: 1984–1991
- Length: 68:25
- Label: Warner Bros.
- Producers: Alan Tarney; A-ha

A-ha chronology
East of the Sun, West of the Moon (1990)	Headlines and Deadlines: The Hits of A-ha (1991)	Memorial Beach (1993)

Headlines and Deadlines: The Hits of A-ha is a greatest hits album by Norwegian synth-pop band A-ha. It was released on 4 November 1991 by Warner Bros. Records. The album reached number 12 in the UK Albums Chart. The new song "Move to Memphis" is featured on this album, and was released as a single in 1991. "Move to Memphis" was later remixed for their fifth studio album, Memorial Beach. The DVD of the same name includes 18 videos. The album was re-released on 22 September 1998.

== Critical reception ==
Professional ratings
Review scores
Source	Rating
AllMusic	4/5 stars
The Encyclopedia of Popular Music	3/5 stars

Upon its release, Paul Lester, writing for Melody Maker, concluded, "If you want the cream of easily the greatest teen group of the last 10 years, buy A-ha's first three albums (their singles are most definitely not their best songs) and make your own compilation." Simon Dudfield of NME described the compilation as "fiscally hoping to make up all the money WEA wasted on trying to relaunch the band as serious artists". He added that "without the videos the song have nothing to recommend themselves", with the exception of "Take on Me" and "The Sun Always Shines on T.V."

== Track listing ==
No.	Title	Writer(s)	From Album	Length
1.	"Take On Me"	Pål Waaktaar / Magne Furuholmen / Morten Harket	Hunting High and Low	3:48
2.	"Cry Wolf"	Pål Waaktaar / Magne Furuholmen	Scoundrel Days	4:09
3.	"Touchy!"	Magne Furuholmen/Morten Harket/Pål Waaktaar	Stay on These Roads	4:37
4.	"You Are the One (7" Remix)"	Pål Waaktaar / Magne Furuholmen	Stay on These Roads	3:48
5.	"Manhattan Skyline"	Pål Waaktaar / Magne Furuholmen	Scoundrel Days	4:50
6.	"The Blood That Moves the Body"	Pål Waaktaar	Stay on These Roads	4:06
7.	"Early Morning (not on vinyl)"	Paul Waaktaar-Savoy / Magne Furuholmen	East of the Sun, West of the Moon	2:59
8.	"Hunting High and Low"	Pål Waaktaar	Hunting High and Low	3:48
9.	"Move to Memphis"	Pål Waaktaar / Magne Furuholmen	Previously unreleased; later included on 1993's Memorial Beach	6:39
10.	"I've Been Losing You"	Pål Waaktaar	Scoundrel Days	4:27
11.	"The Living Daylights"	John Barry, Pål Waaktaar	The Living Daylights and Stay on These Roads	4:16
12.	"Crying in the Rain"	Howard Greenfield / Carole King	East of the Sun, West of the Moon	4:25
13.	"I Call Your Name"	Paul Waaktaar-Savoy / Magne Furuholmen	East of the Sun, West of the Moon	4:53
14.	"Stay on These Roads"	Pål Waaktaar / Magne Furuholmen / Morten Harket	Stay on These Roads	4:47
15.	"Train of Thought (7" Remix) (not on vinyl)"	Pål Waaktaar	Hunting High and Low	4:17
16.	"The Sun Always Shines on T.V."	Pål Waaktaar	Hunting High and Low	5:04

=== Singles ===
"Move to Memphis" (October 14, 1991)
"The Blood That Moves the Body" (The Gun Remix) (March 30, 1992) (Released to promote the album but not featured on the album itself.)

== VHS & DVD ==
1. "Introduction"
2. "Take On Me"
3. "Cry Wolf"
4. "Touchy"
5. "You Are the One" (Remix)
6. "Manhattan Skyline"
7. "The Blood That Moves the Body"
8. "There's Never a Forever Thing"
9. "Early Morning"
10. "Hunting High and Low"
11. "I've Been Losing You" (Live at NRK)
12. "Crying in the Rain"
13. "I Call Your Name"
14. "Stay on These Roads"
15. "Sycamore Leaves"
16. "Train of Thought"
17. "The Sun Always Shines on T.V."
18. "Move to Memphis" (not on VHS)

== Charts ==
Chart (1991)	Peak position
Austrian Albums (Ö3 Austria)	32
Dutch Albums (Album Top 100)	28
European Albums (Music & Media)	22
French Albums (IFOP)	5
German Albums (Offizielle Top 100)	26
Japanese Albums (Oricon)	16
Norwegian Albums (Music & Media)	8
Swedish Albums (Sverigetopplistan)	47
Swiss Albums (Schweizer Hitparade)	40
UK Albums (Official Charts)	12

Chart (1996)	Peak position
Belgian Albums (Ultratop Wallonia)	45
French Compilation Albums (SNEP)	24

Chart (2001)	Peak position
Irish Albums (IRMA)	28

== Certifications ==
Region	Certification	Certified units/sales
Argentina (CAPIF)	Platinum	60,000^{^}
France (SNEP)	Platinum	300,000^{*}
Germany (BVMI)	Platinum	500,000^{^}
Japan (RIAJ)	Gold	100,000^{^}
Spain (Promusicae)	Gold	50,000^{^}
United Kingdom (BPI)	Platinum	300,000^{^}
^{*} Sales figures based on certification alone.^{^} Shipments figures based on certification alone.
