= The Definitive Singles Collection 1984–2004 =

Greatest hits album by A-ha
- Released: 11 April 2005
- Recorded: 1985–2002
- Genre: New wave; pop rock; synth-pop
- Length: 70:00
- Language: English
- Label: Warner
- Producer: Bill Inglot; Dan Chalmers; Fred Engh

A-ha chronology
How Can I Sleep with Your Voice in My Head (2003)	The Definitive Singles Collection 1984–2004 (2005)	Analogue (2005)

Professional ratings
Review scores
Source	Rating
AllMusic	link
The Encyclopedia of Popular Music	3/5 stars

The Definitive Singles Collection 1984–2004 is a greatest hits album by Norwegian synth-pop band A-ha, released on 11 April 2005.

Despite the title, the album contains tracks from 1985 to 2004, though the original version of "Take On Me" was released in 1984. The album contains 17 of their hits plus an enhanced video for the song "Take On Me". The track listing of this album is slightly different from that of The Singles: 1984–2004. It marked the return of A-ha to the top 20 of the UK Albums Chart, where it peaked at number 14. The album re-entered the chart at number 99 in 2015.

== Comparison ==
The Definitive Singles Collection 1984–2004 has fewer unique singles (17, as "Take On Me" appears twice) than The Singles: 1984–2004 (19). It lacks the following songs:

- "Move to Memphis"
- "Minor Earth, Major Sky"
- "Forever Not Yours"

The album, however, adds the single "You Are the One", which did not feature on The Singles: 1984–2004. This album was the last by the group to be released by Warner Bros. In 2010, the album was released in the US.

== Track listing ==
=== The Singles: 1984–2004 ===
No.	Title	Writer(s)	Original album	Length
1.	"Take On Me"	Magne Furuholmen, Morten Harket, Paul Waaktaar	Hunting High and Low	3:47
2.	"The Sun Always Shines on T.V." (7″ edit)	Waaktaar	Hunting High and Low	4:42
3.	"Train of Thought" (7″ remix)	Waaktaar	Hunting High and Low	4:14
4.	"Hunting High and Low" (7″ remix)	Waaktaar	Hunting High and Low	3:46
5.	"I've Been Losing You"	Waaktaar	Scoundrel Days	4:24
6.	"Cry Wolf"	Furuholmen, Waaktaar	Scoundrel Days	4:03
7.	"Manhattan Skyline" (7″ edit)	Furuholmen, Waaktaar	Scoundrel Days	4:18
8.	"The Living Daylights" (single version)	John Barry, Waaktaar	The Living Daylights	4:14
9.	"Stay on These Roads"	Furuholmen, Harket, Waaktaar	Stay on These Roads	4:46
10.	"Touchy!"	Furuholmen, Harket, Waaktaar	Stay on These Roads	4:33
11.	"Crying in the Rain"	Carole King, Howard Greenfield	East of the Sun, West of the Moon	4:22
12.	"Move to Memphis"	Furuholmen, Waaktaar	Memorial Beach	4:13
13.	"Dark Is the Night for All"	Waaktaar	Memorial Beach	3:46
14.	"Shapes That Go Together" (non-album single)	Furuholmen, Waaktaar		4:14
15.	"Summer Moved On" (radio edit)	Waaktaar	Minor Earth Major Sky	4:03
16.	"Minor Earth Major Sky" (radio edit)	Furuholmen, Waaktaar	Minor Earth Major Sky	4:03
17.	"Velvet" (radio edit)	Lauren Savoy, Waaktaar	Minor Earth Major Sky	4:05
18.	"Forever Not Yours"	Furuholmen, Harket, Ole Sverre-Olsen	Lifelines	4:03
19.	"Lifelines" (single version)	Furuholmen	Lifelines	3:58

=== The Definitive Singles Collection 1984–2004 ===
1. "Take On Me"
2. "The Sun Always Shines on T.V."
3. "Train of Thought"
4. "Hunting High and Low"
5. "I've Been Losing You"
6. "Cry Wolf"
7. "Manhattan Skyline"
8. "The Living Daylights"
9. "Stay on These Roads"
10. "Touchy!"
11. "You Are the One (Album Version)"
12. "Crying in the Rain"
13. "Dark is the Night"
14. "Shapes That Go Together"
15. "Summer Moved On"
16. "Lifelines"
17. "Velvet"
18. "Take On Me" (enhanced video)

== Charts ==
The Singles: 1984–2004
Chart (2004–2005)	Peak position
German Albums (Offizielle Top 100)	49
Norwegian Albums (VG-lista)	4
Swedish Albums (Sverigetopplistan)	8

The Definitive Singles Collection 1984–2004
Chart (2005–2006)	Peak position
Irish Albums (IRMA)	44
Scottish Albums (OCC)	23
UK Albums (OCC)	14

== Certifications ==
Region	Certification	Certified units/sales
Germany (BVMI)	Gold	100,000^{^}
United Kingdom (BPI)	Gold	100,000^{^}
^{^} Shipments figures based on certification alone.
