= List of awards and nominations received by A-ha =

A-ha awards and nominations
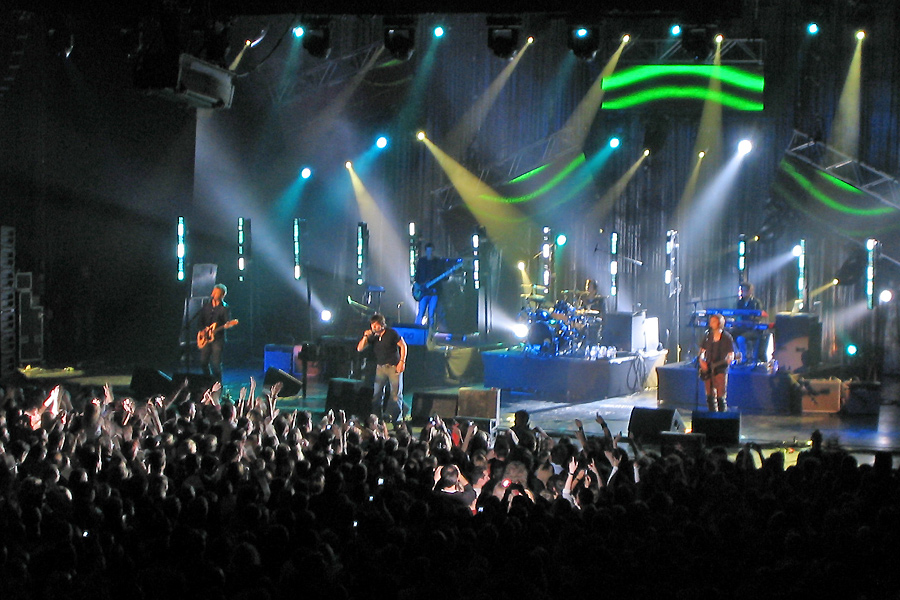
- A-ha performing at a concert in Frankfurt, Germany in 2005
Awards and nominations
Award	Wins	Nominations

Totals (Note: Certain award groups do not simply award one winner. They acknowledge several different recipients, have runners-up, and have third place. Since this is a specific recognition and is different from losing an award, runner-up mentions are considered wins in this award tally. For simplification and to avoid errors, each award in this list has been presumed to have had a prior nomination.)
- Wins: 69
- Nominations: 95

This is a comprehensive list of major music awards received by A-ha, a Norwegian synth-pop band. Formed in 1982 by Morten Harket, Magne Furuholmen, and Paul Waaktaar-Savoy, A-ha have been one of the most popular European acts in the world since the mid-1980s. The band has sold more than 100 million albums and singles worldwide, and has been nominated for one Grammy Award, more than any other Norwegian rock band.

A-ha achieved mainstream success with their debut album Hunting High and Low and the single "Take On Me" in 1985. After the release of the album A-ha was nominated for Best New Artist. In 1994, the band went on a hiatus. After a performance at the Nobel Peace Prize Concert in 1998, the band returned to the studio and recorded 2000's Minor Earth Major Sky, which resulted in a new started to work on their new album. In 2002 the band released their seventh studio album Lifelines. Analogue was released in 2005 and has been certified Silver. Their 2009 album "Foot of the Mountain" is their highest charting album in the U.K. since 1988's "Stay on These Roads".

== Royal Norwegian Order of St. Olav ==
The three members of a-ha, Morten Harket, Magne Furuholmen and Paul Waaktaar Savoy, was appointed Knights of the 1st Class of the Royal Norwegian Order of St. Olav for their contribution to Norwegian music. The Royal Norwegian Order of St. Olav is granted as a reward for distinguished services to their country and mankind. The official ceremony took place on 6 November 2012.

Year	Type of Award	Category	Awarded to	Ribbon	Medal
2012	Royal Norwegian Order of St. Olav	Knight 1st class	Magne Furuholmen of a-ha		
2012	Royal Norwegian Order of St. Olav	Knight 1st class	Morten Harket of a-ha		
2012	Royal Norwegian Order of St. Olav	Knight 1st class	Paul Waaktaar-Savoy of a-ha		

== ROCKHEIM ==
The National Discovery Centre for Pop and Rock, and Det nasjonale museet for populærmusikk, The National Museum for Popular Music) is Norway's national museum for popular music from the 1950s to the present.

Year	Type of Award	Category	Awarded to	Status
2011	Rockheim Hall of Fame	Pop/Rock	Magne Furuholmen of a-ha	Inducted
2011	Rockheim Hall of Fame	Pop/Rock	Morten Harket of a-ha	inducted
2011	Rockheim Hall of Fame	Pop/Rock	Paul Waaktaar-Savoy of a-ha	Inducted

== Awards and nominations ==
Award	Year	Nominee(s)	Category	Result	Ref.
American Music Awards	1986	"Take On Me"	Favorite Pop/Rock Video	Nominated	
BMI London Awards	1991	"Take On Me"	BMI Outstanding Achievement Award 1 Million	Won	
BMI London Awards	2007	"Take On Me"	BMI Outstanding Achievement Award 3 Million	Won	
BMI London Awards	2013	"Take On Me"	BMI Outstanding Achievement Award 4 Million	Won	
BMI London Awards	2014	"Feel This Moment"	Award-Winning Song	Won	
BMI London Awards	2019	"Take On Me"	BMI Outstanding Achievement Award 6 Million	Won	
BMI London Awards	2020	"Take On Me"	BMI Outstanding Achievement Award 7 Million	Won	
BMI London Awards	2022	"Take On Me"	BMI Outstanding Achievement Award 8 Million	Won	
Billboard Music Awards	1985	Themselves	Top Pop Singles Artist	Nominated	
Billboard Music Awards	1985	Themselves	Top Pop Singles Artist - Duo/Group	Nominated	
Billboard Music Awards	1985	"Take On Me"	Top Pop Single	Nominated	
Billboard Music Awards	1986	"The Sun Always Shines on T.V."	Top Dance Sales Single	Nominated	
Bravo Otto Awards	1985	Themselves	Band: Bronze Award	Won	
Bravo Otto Awards	1986	Themselves	Rock Group: Gold Award	Won	
Bravo Otto Awards	1987	Themselves	Rock Group: Gold Award	Won	
Bravo Otto Awards	1988	Themselves	Rock Group: Silver Award	Won	
Brit Awards	1987	Themselves	International Group	Nominated	
Gammleng Awards	2008	Themselves	Pop Music	Won	
Grammy Awards	1986	Themselves	Best New Artist	Nominated	
Guinness World Records	1991	Themselves	Largest Paying Audience	Won	
Hungarian Music Awards	2010	Foot of the Mountain	Best Foreign Pop Album	Nominated	
IM&MC Music Video Awards	1986	"Take On Me"	Best Videoclip	Won	
Ivor Novello Awards	1988	"The Living Daylights"	Best Film Score Theme or Song	Nominated	
Japan Gold Disc Awards	1989	Stay on These Roads	International Album of the Year	Won	
MTV Video Music Awards	1986	"Take On Me"	Video of the Year	Nominated	
MTV Video Music Awards	1986	"Take On Me"	Best Group Video	Nominated	
MTV Video Music Awards	1986	"Take On Me"	Best New Artist	Won	
MTV Video Music Awards	1986	"Take On Me"	Best Concept Video	Won	
MTV Video Music Awards	1986	"Take On Me"	Most Experimental Video	Won	
MTV Video Music Awards	1986	"Take On Me"	Best Direction	Won	
MTV Video Music Awards	1986	"Take On Me"	Best Special Effects	Won	
MTV Video Music Awards	1986	"Take On Me"	Viewer's Choice	Won	
MTV Video Music Awards	1986	"The Sun Always Shines on T.V."	Best Art Direction	Nominated	
MTV Video Music Awards	1986	"The Sun Always Shines on T.V."	Best Editing	Won	
MTV Video Music Awards	1986	"The Sun Always Shines on T.V."	Best Cinematography	Won	
Music Week Awards	1986	"Hunting High and Low"	British Music Promo Video		
Nordic Music Awards	2004	Themselves	Prize of Honor	Won	
Norwegian Music Hall of Fame	2011	Themselves	Inducted	Won	
Peer Gynt Prize	1987	Themselves	Peer Gynt Prize	Won	
Q Awards	2006	Themselves	Q Inspiration Award	Won	
Spellemannprisen	1985	Hunting High and Low	Spellemann of the Year	Won	
Spellemannprisen	1985	Hunting High and Low	Pop of the Year	Won	
Spellemannprisen	1986	Scoundrel Days	Pop of the Year	Won	
Spellemannprisen	1986	"Hunting High and Low"	Music Video of the Year	Won	
Spellemannprisen	1986	Themselves	Jury Honorary Award	Honoree	
Spellemannprisen	1988	Stay on These Roads	Pop of the Year	Nominated	
Spellemannprisen	1990	East of the Sun, West of the Moon	Pop of the Year	Nominated	
Spellemannprisen	1993	Memorial Beach	Pop of the Year	Nominated	
Spellemannprisen	2000	Minor Earth Major Sky	Pop of the Year	Nominated	
Spellemannprisen	2000	"Summer Moved On"	Song of the Year	Nominated	
Spellemannprisen	2000	"Velvet"	Music Video of the Year	Won	
Spellemannprisen	2000	Themselves	Honorary Award	Honoree	
Spellemannprisen	2001	"Take On Me"	The Norwegian Hit of All Time	Nominated	
Spellemannprisen	2002	"Forever Not Yours"	Song of the Year	Nominated	
Spellemannprisen	2002	"Lifelines"	Music Video of the Year	Nominated	
Spellemannprisen	2010	Themselves	Honorary Award	Won	
Spellemannprisen	2015	Cast in Steel	Pop Group of the Year	Nominated	
UK Festival Awards	2006	Themselves	Festival Feel-Good Act	Nominated	
Viña del Mar Festival	2006	Themselves	Antorcha de Oro	Won	
Viña del Mar Festival	2006	Themselves	Antorcha de Plata	Won	
Viña del Mar Festival	2006	Themselves	Gaviota de Plata	Won	
World Music Awards	1993	Themselves	World's Best-Selling Norwegian Artists	Won	
World Music Awards	2010	Themselves	World's Best-Selling Scandinavian Artists	Won	

== Goldene Europa Award ==
Year	Type of award	Category	Won / Awarded / Nominated
2001	Goldene Europa Award	Comeback des Jahres Award	Won
1988	Goldene Europa Award	Best Album (Stay On These Roads)	Won
1986	Goldene Europa Award	Best Musicvideo (Take On Me)	Won

== Smash Hits Poll Winners Party ==
The Smash Hits Poll Winners Party was an awards ceremony held annually by British magazine Smash Hits, and broadcast on BBC One.

Year	Nominee / work	Award	Result
1985	A-ha	Best Group	Nominated
1986	A-ha	Best Group	Won
1987	A-ha	Best Group	Nominated
1987	A-ha	Worst Group	Nominated
1988	A-ha	Worst Group	Nominated
1988	A-ha	Best Group	Nominated
1988	"Touchy!"	Best Pop Video	Nominated
1986	Morten Harket (A-ha)	Best singer	Won

== Various other awards ==
Year	Type of award	Category	Won / Awarded / Nominated
1987	British Industry Award	Best Group Video (Cry Wolf)	Won
2021	Nashville Film Festival	Grand Jury Price - Best Music Documentary Feature: (A-HA - The Movie) (Thomas Robsahm and Aslaug Holm)	Nominated
2021	Tribeca Film Festival	Audience award - documentary (A-HA - The Movie) (Thomas Robsahm and Aslaug Holm)	Nominated
2021	Nordisk Panorama	Best Nordic Documentary (A-HA - The Movie) (Thomas Robsahm and Aslaug Holm)	Nominated
2016	The Radio Regenbogen Awards (German Radio Award)	Comeback of the Year Award	Won
2015	Deutscher Radiopreis (German Radio Award)	Sonderpreis des beirats (Special Prize of the Advisory Board)	Won
2015	Norske vidAwards	Taylor honorary award	Won
2010	Echo (music award)	Best International Pop/Rock Group	Nominated
2023	Pop Awards 2023	Lifetime Achievement Award	Won
2009	SWR's New Pop Festival	Pioneer Of Pop Award	Won
2000	VIVA Germany Comet Preis	Comeback Award	Won
1986	The Golden Rose Festival, Switzerland	Best musicvideo award for Take On Me	Won
1986	Det Nye - Sølvmikrofonen prisen	Best Norwegian group of the year	Won
1986	West German TV channel "SR"	Best musicvideo Take On Me	Won
1987	Australian Video Awards	Musicvideo (Hunting High and Low)	Won
1986	Australian pop music awards	Most popular international act	Won
1987	Montreux, the "IM&MC Gala"	Best group video award (British Industry Award)	Won
1987	Azzurro 87 Festival in Bari	n/a	Won
1987	Berolina Awards, Germany	Best international group	Won
1987	The Diamonds Awards, Belgium	For the song Touchy!	Won
1986	Pollstar Concert Industry Awards	Next Major Arena Headliner	Nominated
1986	Veronika Award Netherlands	Number one at top 40 with Train of Thought	Won
