= How Can I Sleep with Your Voice in My Head =

Live album by A-ha
- Released: 25 March 2003
- Recorded: 15 September – 10 October 2002
- Venue: Hallenstadion, Zürich; Wembley Arena, London; Arena Leipzig, Leipzig; Zénith Paris, Paris; Heineken Music Hall, Amsterdam
- Length: 73:20
- Label: WEA
- Producer: A-ha

A-ha chronology
Lifelines (2002)	How Can I Sleep with Your Voice in My Head (2003)	The Singles: 1984–2004 (2005)

Professional ratings
Review scores
Source	Rating
AllMusic	link

How Can I Sleep with Your Voice in My Head is a live album by Norwegian synth-pop band A-ha, released on 25 March 2003 by WEA Records.

== Track listing ==
1. "Forever Not Yours" (Morten Harket, Ole Sverre-Olsen, Magne Furuholmen) – 4:33
2. "Minor Earth Major Sky" (Paul Waaktaar-Savoy, Magne Furuholmen) – 5:41
3. "Manhattan Skyline" (Paul Waaktaar-Savoy, Magne Furuholmen) – 5:50
4. "I've Been Losing You" (Paul Waaktaar-Savoy) – 4:09
5. "Crying in the Rain" (Howard Greenfield, Carole King) – 4:56
6. "The Sun Always Shines on T.V." (Paul Waaktaar-Savoy) – 5:51
7. "Did Anyone Approach You?" (Paul Waaktaar-Savoy) – 4:53
8. "The Swing of Things" (Paul Waaktaar-Savoy) – 5:27
9. "Lifelines" (Magne Furuholmen) – 4:37
10. "Stay on These Roads" (Paul Waaktaar-Savoy, Magne Furuholmen, Morten Harket) – 3:34
11. "Hunting High and Low" (Paul Waaktaar-Savoy) – 5:54
12. "Take On Me" (Paul Waaktaar-Savoy, Magne Furuholmen, Morten Harket) – 5:42
13. "The Living Daylights" (John Barry, Paul Waaktaar-Savoy) – 7:32
14. "Summer Moved On" (Paul Waaktaar-Savoy) – 4:41

Bonus disc (not included with all versions)

1. "Scoundrel Days" (Paul Waaktaar-Savoy, Magne Furuholmen)
2. "Oranges on Appletrees" (Magne Furuholmen, Morten Harket)
3. "Cry Wolf" (Paul Waaktaar-Savoy, Magne Furuholmen)
4. "Dragonfly" (Magne Furuholmen)
5. "Time and Again" (Paul Waaktaar-Savoy)
6. "Sycamore Leaves" (Paul Waaktaar-Savoy)
7. A-ha Tourbook (Video)

=== Notes ===
- Only some editions include the bonus disc, which concentrates on album tracks. The regular single disc version is composed of live versions of singles, save for the live version of "The Swing of Things" which was never released as a single.
- Waaktaar-Savoy handles vocals on "Sycamore Leaves", as he does on the version with his other band Savoy. Furuholmen takes lead vocals on "Dragonfly", which was originally a solo single before it was recorded by A-ha for their Lifelines album.
- "Crying in the Rain" is sung as a duet between Harket and Anneli Drecker.

== Personnel ==
A-ha

- Morten Harket – lead vocals
- Magne Furuholmen – lead vocals on "Dragonfly", keyboards, guitars, backing vocals
- Paul Waaktaar-Savoy – lead vocals on "Sycamore Leaves", guitars, backing vocals

Additional musicians

- Anneli Drecker – backing vocals
- Christer Karlsson – keyboards
- Sven Lindvall – bass
- Per Lindvall – drums

== Charts ==
Chart (2003)	Peak position
Austrian Albums (Ö3 Austria)	73
French Albums (SNEP)	88
German Albums (Offizielle Top 100)	8
Norwegian Albums (VG-lista)	4
Swiss Albums (Schweizer Hitparade)	36
