= List of awards and nominations received by Morten Harket =

Morten Harket awards and nominations
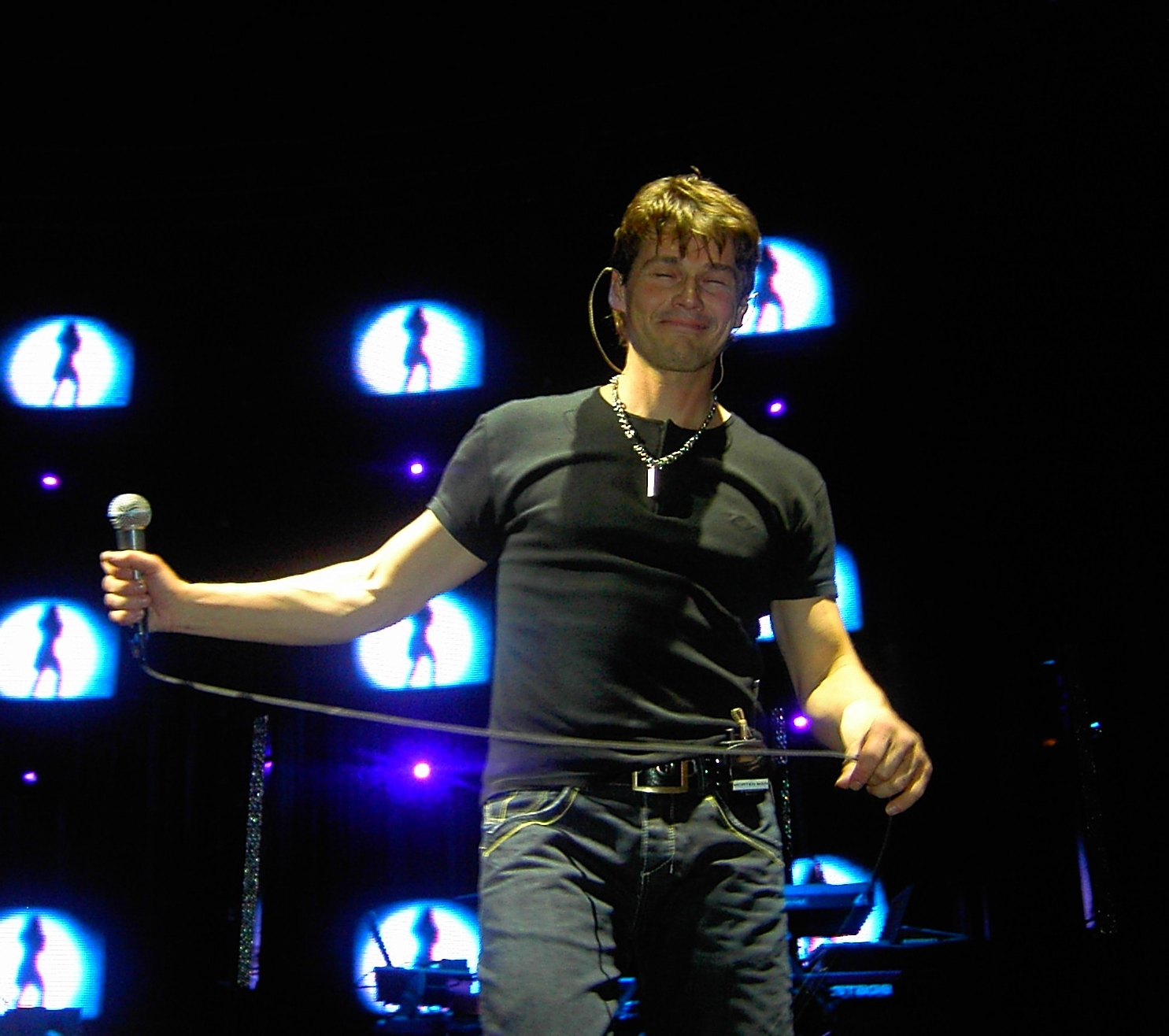
Awards and nominations
Award	Wins	Nominations
Spellemannprisen	4	0
Giffoni Film Festival	1	0

Totals (Note: Certain award groups do not simply award one winner. They acknowledge several different recipients, have runners-up, and have third place. Since this is a specific recognition and is different from losing an award, runner-up mentions are considered wins in this award tally. For simplification and to avoid errors, each award in this list has been presumed to have had a prior nomination.)
- Wins: 5

This is a list of Morten Harket awards. For his awards with a-ha see List of a-ha awards.

== Awards ==
=== Royal Norwegian Order of St. Olav ===
The three members of a-ha, Morten Harket, Magne Furuholmen and Paul Waaktaar Savoy, were appointed Knights of the 1st Class of the Royal Norwegian Order of St. Olav for their contribution to Norwegian music. The Royal Norwegian Order of St. Olav is granted as a reward for distinguished services to their country and mankind. The official ceremony took place on 6 November 2012.

2012	Royal Norwegian Order of St. Olav	Knight 1st class	Morten Harket of a-ha

=== 14 August komiteen / 14 August committee ===
Year	Award name	Category	Result
2003	14 August komiteen / 14 August committee	Pakistansk - Norsk brobyggerpris	Won

=== Clean Tech Media Awards ===
Year	Award name	Category	Result
2012	Clean Tech Media Awards	Green Music Award	Won

=== Spellemannprisen ===
Year	Award	Result
1995	Best album: Wild Seed	Won
1995	Song of the Year: A Kind of Christmas Card	Won
1995	Spellemann of the Year	Won
1995	Best Male Performer	Won

=== Giffoni Film Festival ===
Year	Award	Result
1989	François Truffaut film award	Won
