= Shapes That Go Together =

Single by A-ha
- B-side: "Cold as Stone" (remix)
- Released: 14 March 1994
- Length: 4:15
- Label: Warner Bros.
- Songwriters: Magne Furuholmen; Paul Waaktaar-Savoy
- Producer: Christopher Neil

A-ha singles chronology
"Lie Down in Darkness" (1993)	"Shapes That Go Together" (1994)	"Summer Moved On" (2000)

Music video
- "Shapes That Go Together" on YouTube

"Shapes That Go Together" is a song by Norwegian synth-pop band A-ha and the official song of the Paralympics '94, which were held at Lillehammer, Norway. It was written by Magne Furuholmen and Paul Waaktaar-Savoy, produced by Christopher Neil and arranged by A-ha and Kjetil Bjerkestrand. The song was released in February 1994, by Warner Bros., and reached number 27 on the UK Singles Chart, staying within the charts for three weeks. It also reached number 57 in Germany, number 28 in Poland and number 15 in Denmark. Barry Maguire directed the song's accompanying music video. The band performed "Shapes That Go Together" at the 1994 IRMA Awards in Dublin.

== Background ==
The song didn't appear on an album until 10 years later, when it appeared on the Singles: 1984–2004 and The Definitive Singles Collection 1984–2004 greatest hits albums. The song, as well as its B-side "Cold as Stone", also appeared on the compilation album 25. The German-made disc is silver and green depicting the Paralympics emblem, while the A-ha logo and track listings are printed in white letters. It has sold 275,000 copies worldwide.

The second 5-inch CD-single is a limited edition numbered CD. It comes in an album style case with a card insert. The front is in various shades of pinks and purples instead of greens and blues, but has the same cover design. It contains three four-and-a-half-inch photographic prints, one of each band member (taken from the "Dark Is the Night for All" music video). The spine is black with white titles. The CD is silver 'matte effect' with black titles and A-ha-logo. The back cover of the CD is black with white text and has the same group picture as on the back of the 7-inch.

== Critical reception ==
Upon its release, pan-European magazine Music & Media wrote, "Forget about that animated video of the pre-history. Shaped as "U-Hu", they are a "serious" band now." Paul Moody of NME commented, "'Shapes That Go Together' – while not being quite as tumultuous as Duran's comeback epic 'Ordinary World' – is a breathy strut as good as any of them [their previous hits]. David Bowie's rendition of 'China Girl' is, of course, better at articulating the mood of loss A-ha are after. But not much better."

== Music video ==
The song's accompanying music video was directed by Barry Maguire. It is a simple black-and-white studio film with sepia tones, and is one of the few A-ha videos featuring a backing band with a drummer and a bass player. The video is commercially available on the 25 compilation album.

== Track listings ==
- 7-inch: Warner Bros. Records / W0236 (Europe)

A1. "Shapes That Go Together" – 4:13
A2. "Cold as Stone" (re-mix) – 4:32

- CD: Warner Bros. Records / WO236CD (Europe)
1. "Shapes That Go Together" – 4:15
2. "Cold as Stone" (re-mix) – 4:33
3. "Shapes That Go Together" (instrumental version) – 4:24
- Limited-edition CD: Warner Bros. Records / W0236CDX (Europe)
1. "Shapes That Go Together" – 4:13
2. "Slender Frame" (live) – 4:05
3. "Touchy!" (live) – 6:46
4. "Rolling Thunder" (live) – 6:13

Note: The live tracks on the limited edition CD are taken from the video Live in South America.

== Charts ==
Weekly chart performance for "Shapes That Go Together"
Chart (1994)	Peak position
Europe (Eurochart Hot 100)	54
Europe (European AC Radio)	12
Europe (European Hit Radio)	24
Germany (GfK)	57
Iceland (Íslenski Listinn Topp 40)	19
UK Singles (Official Charts)	27
UK Airplay (Music Week)	39
