= Where Has Everybody Gone? =

Promotional single by The Pretenders

from the album The Living Daylights
- B-side: "If There Was a Man"
- Released: August 1987
- Genre: Alternative rock
- Label: Warner Bros.
- Songwriters: Chrissie Hynde, John Barry
- Producer: Paul O'Duffy

The Pretenders singles chronology
"Room Full of Mirrors" (1987)	"Where Has Everybody Gone?" (1987)	"If There Was a Man" (1987)

"Where Has Everybody Gone?" is a 1987 song by the British rock band the Pretenders. It was one of two songs recorded by the band for the soundtrack of the 1987 James Bond film The Living Daylights, the other being "If There Was a Man". "Where Has Everybody Gone?" peaked at number 26 on the United States Billboard Mainstream Rock Tracks chart.

Both "Where Has Everybody Gone?" and "If There Was a Man" are included on The Living Daylights soundtrack, as well as an instrument remix of the former. In the film, the henchman Necros (Andreas Wisniewski) is seen listening to the song through his earphones several times and the song starts up a few times when he appears on screen. An instrumental version plays during the fight between Necros and Agent Green-4 (Bill Weston) at the MI6 safe house, and then again when Necros and James Bond (Timothy Dalton) fight aboard the Soviet cargo plane.

== Personnel ==
- Chrissie Hynde - rhythm guitar, lead vocals, occasional harmonica
- Robbie McIntosh - lead guitar, backing vocals
- Malcolm Foster - bass, backing vocals
- Rupert Black - keyboards
- Blair Cunningham - drums, backing vocals, occasional percussion

== See also ==
- Outline of James Bond
