= Butterfly, Butterfly (The Last Hurrah) =

Single by A-ha

from the album 25
- B-side: "Butterfly, Butterfly (The Last Hurrah)" (Steve Osborne Version)
- Released: 5 July 2010
- Recorded: 2010
- Genre: Synth-pop, alternative rock
- Length: 4:10 (album version); 3:40 (single edit)
- Label: Warner Music
- Songwriter: Paul Waaktaar-Savoy
- Producer: Martin Terefe

A-ha singles chronology
"Shadowside" (2009)	"Butterfly, Butterfly (The Last Hurrah)" (2010)	"Under the Makeup" (2015)

"Butterfly, Butterfly (The Last Hurrah)" is a song by Norwegian synth-pop band A-ha, and their final recording before their second splitting on 4 December 2010. The song was sold digitally in Norway from July 5. It is included on 25, a compilation album released on July 19. Its world premiere was on June 14, 2010.

The single entered the Norwegian single chart at #13 and reached #6 on the airplay chart soon after. It also charted at #66 in the World singles official top 100.

== Music video ==
Much like many of A-ha's early music videos (including that of "Take On Me"), the music video for "Butterfly, Butterfly (The Last Hurrah)" was directed by Steve Barron, and features stop-frame animation by student animator Stefan Ramirez. The video shows the band playing under a bridge (shot on location in Shoreham-by-Sea) amidst clips from previous music videos for Take On Me, The Sun Always Shines on T.V., Manhattan Skyline and Cry Wolf (all directed by Barron) intercut and projected onto the concrete pillars. The video ends with the band embracing one last time before leaping into the air, transforming into butterflies and flying away.

Barron said, of his involvement:

"It was really nice to work with A-ha again, especially as I had not made a music video for such a long time... I wanted to create a really emotional film to accompany the sentiments of the track. To hopefully bring a tear to the eye from, especially, the fans... I asked Morten, Pal and Mags to embrace, get close, almost uncomfortable and then silently say goodbye. It was certainly very powerful on the day. It seemed to sum up how much they had been through together and still stayed as one."

== Track list ==
=== UK/Germany/French CD Single ===
1. Butterfly, Butterfly (The Last Hurrah) (Single Edit)
2. Butterfly, Butterfly (The Last Hurrah) (Steve Osborne Version)

=== iTunes Digital EP (Germany) ===
1. Butterfly, Butterfly (The Last Hurrah) (Album Version)
2. Butterfly, Butterfly (The Last Hurrah) (Steve Osborne Version)
3. The Sun Always Shines On TV (Album Version)
4. Hunting High And Low (Album Version)
5. Stay On These Roads (Video)
- The single was available as a digital download, and also a physical single in Germany, France and the UK. The single was released in the UK on Monday 20 September 2010.

== Charts ==
Chart performance for "Butterfly, Butterfly (The Last Hurrah)"
Chart (2010)	Peak position
Germany (GfK)	22
Israel (Media Forest)	9
Norway (VG-lista)	13
UK Singles (Official Charts)	98
