= Live at Vallhall: Homecoming =

Video by A-ha
- Released: 5 November 2001
- Recorded: 24–25 March 2001
- Venue: Vallhall Arena, Oslo
- Label: Warner Music Vision
- Producer: A-ha

Live at Vallhall: Homecoming is a live video album by Norwegian synth-pop band A-ha, released on 5 November 2001 by Warner Music Vision. It was filmed during the band's two concerts at Vallhall Arena in Oslo on 24 and 25 March 2001.

== Track listing ==
=== Live at Vallhall ===
1. "Minor Earth Major Sky" (Magne Furuholmen, Paul Waaktaar-Savoy)
2. "The Sun Never Shone That Day" (Lauren Savoy, Paul Waaktaar-Savoy)
3. "Little Black Heart" (Magne Furuholmen, Paul Waaktaar-Savoy)
4. "I've Been Losing You" (Paul Waaktaar-Savoy)
5. "Manhattan Skyline" (Magne Furuholmen, Paul Waaktaar-Savoy)
6. "Thought That It Was You" (Morten Harket, Ole Sverre-Olsen)
7. "I Wish I Cared" (Magne Furuholmen)
8. "Cry Wolf" (Magne Furuholmen, Paul Waaktaar-Savoy)
9. "Mary Ellen Makes the Moment Count" (Paul Waaktaar-Savoy)
10. "Stay on These Roads (Magne Furuholmen, Morten Harket, Paul Waaktaar-Savoy)
11. "Early Morning" (Magne Furuholmen, Paul Waaktaar-Savoy)
12. "You'll Never Get Over Me" (Paul Waaktaar-Savoy)
13. "Velvet" (Lauren Savoy, Paul Waaktaar-Savoy)
14. "The Sun Always Shines on T.V." (Paul Waaktaar-Savoy)
15. "The Living Daylights" (John Barry, Paul Waaktaar-Savoy)
16. "Hunting High and Low" (Paul Waaktaar-Savoy)
17. "Summer Moved On" (Paul Waaktaar-Savoy)
18. "Crying in the Rain" (Carole King, Howard Greenfield)
19. "Take On Me" (Magne Furuholmen, Morten Harket, Paul Waaktaar-Savoy)

Bonus Disc – Live at Grimstad (not included in all versions)

1. "Stay on These Roads (Magne Furuholmen, Morten Harket, Paul Waaktaar-Savoy)"
2. "Early Morning (Magne Furuholmen, Paul Waaktaar-Savoy)"
3. "You'll Never Get Over Me (Paul Waaktaar-Savoy)"
4. "Summer Moved On (Paul Waaktaar-Savoy)"
5. "The Living Daylights (John Barry, Paul Waaktaar-Savoy)" (taken from Vallhall, Oslo 25 March 2001)
6. "Angel in the Snow" (taken from Vallhall Oslo, 24 March 2001)

== Personnel ==
- Paul Waaktaar-Savoy – guitars, backing vocals
- Magne Furuholmen – keyboards, backing vocals
- Morten Harket – vocals
- Christer Karlsson – keyboards
- Sven Lindvall – bass
- Per Lindvall – drums
- Anneli Drecker – backing vocals
- Dinamo Live As., a-ha – producer

== Certifications ==
Certifications and sales for Live at Vallhall: Homecoming
Region	Certification	Certified units/sales
Argentina (CAPIF)	Platinum	8,000^{^}
^{^} Shipments figures based on certification alone.
