= MTV Unplugged: Summer Solstice =

Live album by A-ha
- Released: 6 October 2017
- Recorded: 22–23 June 2017
- Studio: Ocean Sound Recordings, Giske, Norway
- Label: Polydor; We Love Music
- Producer: Lars Horntveth; A-ha; Martin Terefe

A-ha chronology
Time and Again: The Ultimate A-ha (2016)	MTV Unplugged: Summer Solstice (2017)	True North (2022)

Singles from MTV Unplugged: Summer Solstice
- 1. "This Is Our Home" Released: 8 September 2017; 2. "The Sun Always Shines on TV" Released: 15 September 2017; 3. "The Living Daylights" Released: 22 September 2017; 4. "Take On Me" Released: 29 September 2017

Professional ratings
Review scores
Source	Rating
AllMusic	4/5 stars

MTV Unplugged: Summer Solstice is a live album by the Norwegian synth-pop band a-ha, released on 6 October 2017 as part of the MTV Unplugged series. It was recorded live at the Harbour Hall at Ocean Sound Recordings in Giske Municipality, Norway, on 22 and 23 June 2017.

== Commercial performance ==
The album debuted at number six on the UK Albums Chart with 6,982 units sold in its first week, becoming A-ha's seventh top-10 album in the United Kingdom.

== Track listing ==
All tracks are produced by Lars Horntveth, except "Take On Me" produced by A-ha and Martin Terefe.

Disc one
No.	Title	Writer(s)	Length
1.	"This Is Our Home" (previously unreleased)	Magne Furuholmen	5:05
2.	"Lifelines"	Furuholmen	5:18
3.	"I've Been Losing You" (featuring Lissie)	Paul Waaktaar-Savoy	5:05
4.	"Analogue (All I Want)"	Waaktaar-Savoy, Furuholmen, Max Martin	4:44
5.	"The Sun Always Shines on TV" (featuring Ingrid Helene Håvik)	Waaktaar-Savoy	4:28
6.	"A Break in the Clouds" (previously unreleased)	Waaktaar-Savoy	4:54
7.	"Foot of the Mountain"	Waaktaar-Savoy, Furuholmen, Martin Terefe	5:27
8.	"Stay on These Roads"	Waaktaar-Savoy, Furuholmen, Morten Harket	6:18
9.	"This Alone Is Love"	Waaktaar-Savoy, Furuholmen	6:07
10.	"Over the Treetops"	Waaktaar-Savoy	6:43
11.	"Forever Not Yours"	Furuholmen, Harket, Ole Sverre-Olsen	4:07

Disc two
No.	Title	Writer(s)	Length
1.	"Sox of the Fox"	Waaktaar-Savoy	7:18
2.	"Scoundrel Days" (featuring Ian McCulloch)	Waaktaar-Savoy, Furuholmen	4:56
3.	"The Killing Moon" (featuring Ian McCulloch)	Will Sergeant, Ian McCulloch, Les Pattinson, Pete de Freitas	5:55
4.	"Summer Moved On" (featuring Alison Moyet)	Waaktaar-Savoy	5:30
5.	"Memorial Beach"	Waaktaar-Savoy	4:32
6.	"Living a Boy's Adventure Tale"	Waaktaar-Savoy, Harket	5:36
7.	"Manhattan Skyline"	Waaktaar-Savoy, Furuholmen	5:48
8.	"The Living Daylights"	Waaktaar-Savoy, John Barry	5:49
9.	"Hunting High and Low"	Waaktaar-Savoy	5:57
10.	"Take On Me"	Waaktaar-Savoy, Furuholmen, Harket	4:14

=== Notes ===
- "Sox of the Fox" was originally recorded as "The Vacant" on the 1980 album Fakkeltog by the band Bridges (previous band of Paul Waaktaar-Savoy and Magne Furuholmen and for whom the former was its lead singer at the time).
- "Killing Moon" is originally from Echo & the Bunnymen's album Ocean Rain (1984).

== Personnel ==
Credits adapted from the liner notes of MTV Unplugged: Summer Solstice.

=== a-ha ===
- Morten Harket – vocals
- Magne Furuholmen – upright piano, harpsichord, celesta, acoustic guitar, flute, backing vocals
- Paul Waaktaar-Savoy – acoustic guitar, backing vocals

=== Additional musicians ===
- Alison Moyet – vocals on "Summer Moved On"
- Ian McCulloch – vocals on "Scoundrel Days" and "The Killing Moon"
- Lissie – vocals on "I've Been Losing You"
- Ingrid Helene Håvik – vocals on "The Sun Always Shines on TV"
- Lars Horntveth – acoustic guitars, resonator, lap steel guitar, vibraphone, bass clarinet, soprano saxophone
- Morten Qvenild – upright piano, harpsichord, harmonium, dulcitone, Fischers mandolinette, autoharp, kokles
- Even Enersen Ormestad – bass
- Karl Oluf Wenneberg – drums, percussion, bells, bass xylophone
- Madeleine Ossum – violin, backing vocals
- Emilie Heldal Lidsheim – viola, backing vocals
- Tove Margrethe Erikstad – cello, backing vocals
- Lars Horntveth – arrangement on all tracks except "Take On Me"
- Martin Terefe – arrangement on "Take On Me"
- Anders Tjore – co-arrangement on "I've Been Losing You", "The Sun Always Shines on TV", "This Alone Is Love", "Summer Moved On" and "Manhattan Skyline"

=== Technical ===
- Lars Horntveth – production on all tracks except "Take On Me"
- A-ha – production on "Take On Me"
- Martin Terefe – production on "Take On Me"
- John O'Mahony – recording, mixing
- Henning Svoren – recording
- Marcus Forsgren – recording (demo sessions)
- Greg Calbi – mastering

=== Artwork ===
- Max Dax – liner notes
- Justin Loomis – photography
- Matthias Löwenstein – artwork, cover
- Season Zero – artwork, cover

== Charts ==
=== Weekly charts ===
Chart (2017)	Peak position
Austrian Albums (Ö3 Austria)	14
Belgian Albums (Ultratop Flanders)	93
Belgian Albums (Ultratop Wallonia)	35
Czech Albums (ČNS IFPI)	99
Dutch Albums (Album Top 100)	98
German Albums (Offizielle Top 100)	3
Greek Albums (IFPI)	23
Norwegian Albums (VG-lista)	14
Scottish Albums (OCC)	4
Spanish Albums (PROMUSICAE)	76
Swiss Albums (Schweizer Hitparade)	20
UK Albums (OCC)	6

=== Year-end charts ===
Chart (2017)	Position
German Albums (Offizielle Top 100)	72
