= Trond Kvernstrøm =

Norwegian TV producer

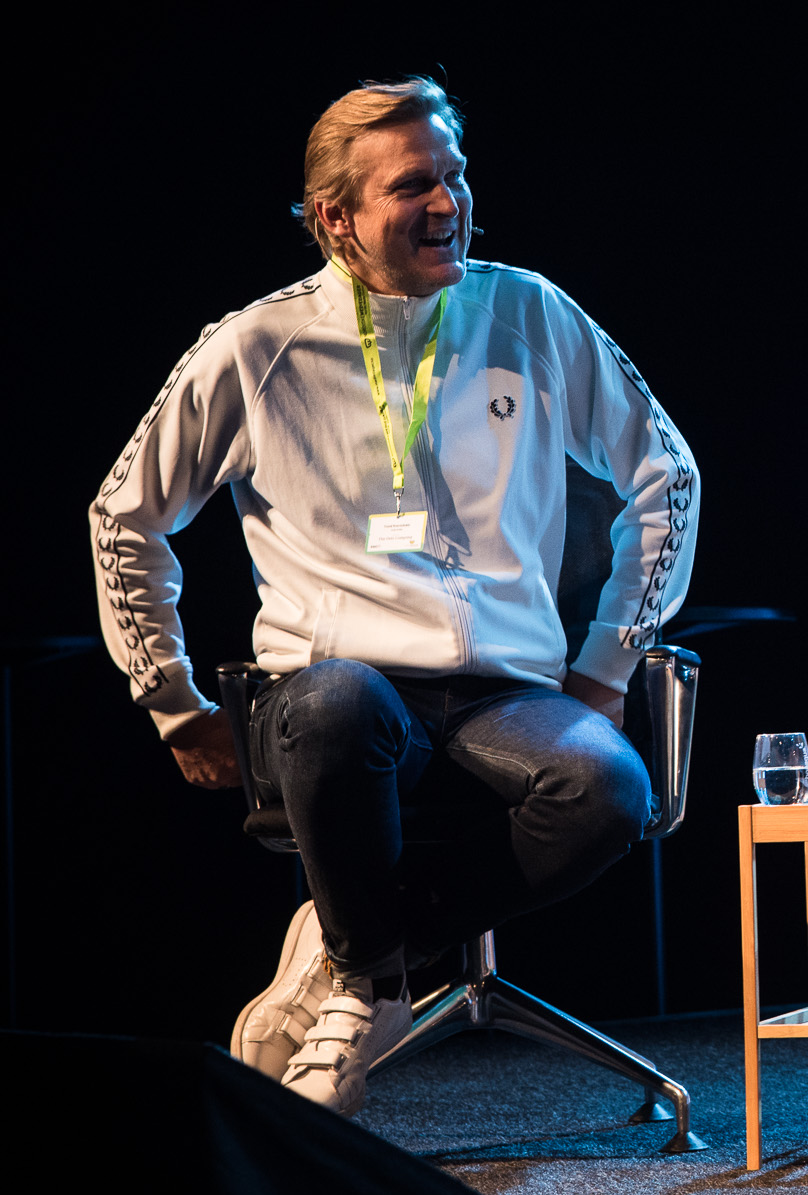
- Kvernstrøm in 2017
- Born: 8 August 1966 (age 58)
- Citizenship: Norway
- Occupations: television producer; film producer
- Awards: Gullruten 2014

Trond Håndlykken Kvernstrøm (born 8 August 1966) is a Norwegian TV producer.

== Biography ==
In 2002, he established the production company Monster Media together with Olav Øen. At the beginning of 2014, he left Monster and went to a position as a director in the TV 2 group, with responsibility for all the advertising channels of the channel. In autumn 2016, he left TV 2.

After leaving TV 2, Kvernstrøm established the production company The Oslo Company (TOC) together with Christian Steen in 2017.

Kvernstrøm has produced Idol, Skal vi danse, Isdans, Nordic Music Awards, Senkveld med Thomas og Harald, and Gullruten. He was awarded the professional prize of the year during the Gullruten 2004, and was named "Media Name of the Year" by the industry magazine Kampanje in 2013.
