= Ending on a High Note: The Final Concert =

Live album by A-ha
- Released: 1 April 2011
- Recorded: 3–4 December 2010
- Venues: Oslo Spektrum, Oslo
- Labels: Universal; We Love Music

A-ha chronology
25 (2010)	Ending on a High Note: The Final Concert (2011)	Cast in Steel (2015)

Professional ratings
Review scores
Source	Rating
Allmusic	3.5/5 stars

Ending on a High Note: The Final Concert is a live album by Norwegian synth-pop band a-ha, released on 1 April 2011. It was recorded at the Oslo Spektrum in Oslo on 4 December 2010, which was initially planned to be their final concert before their eventual reunion in 2015. The concert on the previous night was also recorded as a back-up. The album contains the entire set from the final concert with the exception of "The Bandstand" and "Bowling Green", the latter being an Everly Brothers cover the band performed as part of the final encore.

There were separate CD, DVD, deluxe DVD (two CDs and DVD) and Blu-ray editions. The CD-only release is a one-disc CD and only features 16 tracks.

== Track listing ==
No.	Title	Writer(s)	Length
1.	"The Sun Always Shines on T.V."	Paul Waaktaar-Savoy
2.	"Move to Memphis (Note: Not included on single-disc edition.)"	Waaktaar-Savoy, Magne Furuholmen
3.	"The Blood That Moves the Body"	Waaktaar-Savoy
4.	"Scoundrel Days"	Waaktaar-Savoy, Furuholmen
5.	"The Swing of Things"	Waaktaar-Savoy
6.	"Forever Not Yours"	Furuholmen, Morten Harket, Ole Sverre-Olsen
7.	"Stay on These Roads"	Furuholmen, Harket, Waaktaar-Savoy
8.	"Manhattan Skyline"	Waaktaar-Savoy, Furuholmen
9.	"Hunting High and Low"	Waaktaar-Savoy
10.	"We're Looking for the Whales"	Waaktaar-Savoy
11.	"Butterfly, Butterfly (The Last Hurrah)"	Waaktaar-Savoy
12.	"Crying in the Rain"	Carole King, Howard Greenfield
13.	"Minor Earth Major Sky"	Waaktaar-Savoy, Furuholmen
14.	"Summer Moved On"	Waaktaar-Savoy
15.	"I've Been Losing You"	Waaktaar-Savoy
16.	"Foot of the Mountain"	Furuholmen, Waaktaar-Savoy, Martin Terefe
17.	"Cry Wolf"	Waaktaar-Savoy, Furuholmen
18.	"Analogue (All I Want)"	Waaktaar-Savoy, Furuholmen, Max Martin
19.	"The Living Daylights"	Waaktaar-Savoy, John Barry
20.	"Take On Me"	Furuholmen, Harket, Waaktaar-Savoy

== Personnel ==
Credits adapted from the liner notes of Ending on a High Note: The Final Concert.

=== A-ha ===
- Morten Harket
- Magne Furuholmen
- Paul Waaktaar-Savoy

=== Additional personnel ===
- Karl Oluf Wennerberg – drums
- Erik Ljunggren – keyboards, bass
- Jan Inge Berentsen Anvik – additional programming
- Toby Alington – recording, mixing
- Stian Andersen – photos
- Martin Kvamme – cover design

== Charts ==
=== Weekly charts ===
Album
Chart (2011)	Peak position
Austrian Albums (Ö3 Austria)	61
Belgian Albums (Ultratop Flanders)	87
Belgian Albums (Ultratop Wallonia)	70
Dutch Albums (Album Top 100)	72
German Albums (Offizielle Top 100)	3
Norwegian Albums (VG-lista)	3
Polish Albums (ZPAV)	21
Russian Albums (2M)	24
Scottish Albums (Official Charts)	50
Spanish Albums (Promusicae)	92
Swiss Albums (Schweizer Hitparade)	52
UK Albums (Official Charts)	43

Video
Chart (2011)	Peak position
Austrian Music DVD (Ö3 Austria)	1
Dutch Music DVD (MegaCharts)	11
Hungarian Music DVD (MAHASZ)	6
Irish Music DVD (IRMA)	7
Norwegian Music DVD (VG-lista)	4
Swedish Music DVD (Sverigetopplistan)	1
Swiss Music DVD (Schweizer Hitparade)	4

=== Year-end charts ===
Album
Chart (2011)	Position
German Albums (Offizielle Top 100)	74

Video
Chart (2011)	Position
Russian Music DVD (2M)	5

== Certifications ==
Region	Certification	Certified units/sales
Germany (BVMI)	Gold	100,000^{‡}
^{‡} Sales+streaming figures based on certification alone.
