= The Blood That Moves the Body =

Single by A-ha

from the album Stay on These Roads
- B-side: "There's Never a Forever Thing"
- Released: 6 June 1988
- Length: 4:06
- Label: Warner Bros.
- Songwriter: Pål Waaktaar
- Producer: Alan Tarney

A-ha singles chronology
"Stay on These Roads" (1988)	"The Blood That Moves the Body" (1988)	"Touchy!" (1988)

1992 reissue
- CD single cover

Music video
- "The Blood That Moves the Body" on YouTube

"The Blood That Moves the Body" is a song by Norwegian synth-pop band A-ha, released on 6 June 1988 by Warner Bros. Records as the second single from the band's third studio album, Stay on These Roads (1988). The song was written by bandmember Pål Waaktaar and produced by Alan Tarney. It peaked at number one in Iceland, and was a top 20 hit in Belgium, Ireland, Italy and South Africa. The music video was directed by Andy Morahan and filmed in Austria and France. On 30 March 1992, the song was re-released with the remixes by Alan Tarney. The video remained unchanged. The dark, enigmatic lyrics of this song have been attributed to many things, including teen suicides in Japan and literary references to Eyes of a Blue Dog. The "Two-Time Gun mix" was later included on A-ha's 2010 compilation album, 25, which features all of the band's hits, across two CDs.

== Critical reception ==
Bob Stanley from NME wrote, "In the absence of any Stock Aitken Waterman product this is far and away the best chart pop single of the week. Morten Harket's voice ranges from gruff 'n' moody to its more familiar velveteen lilt, backed by a string arrangement John Barry would be proud of — very good indeed."

== Music video ==
The accompanying music video for "The Blood That Moves the Body" was directed by Andy Morahan and filmed in and around Hotel Regina Louvre in Paris, France. Some additional scenes were filmed in Vienna.

== Track listings ==
- 7-inch single: Warner Bros. / W 7840 United Kingdom (1988)
1. "The Blood That Moves the Body" (album version) – 4:06
2. "There's Never a Forever Thing" – 2:50
- 12-inch single: Warner Bros. / W 7840 TW United Kingdom (1988)
1. "The Blood That Moves the Body" (extended version) – 5:25
2. "The Blood That Moves the Body" (album version) – 4:06
3. "There's Never a Forever Thing" – 2:49

Track 1 is also known as "extended remix" or "extended mix". Also released as a 12-inch picture disc (W 7840 TP).

- CD single: Warner Bros. / W 7840CD United Kingdom (1988)
1. "The Blood That Moves the Body" – 4:07
2. "There's Never a Forever Thing" – 2:51
3. "The Blood That Moves the Body" (extended version) – 5:25
4. "The Living Daylights" (James Bond version) – 4:11
- 7-inch single: Warner Bros. / W 0089 United Kingdom (1992)
1. "The Blood That Moves the Body" (The Gun mix) – 4:15
2. "The Blood That Moves the Body" (Two-Time Gun mix) – 4:17

Remixes by Alan Tarney.

- 12-inch single: Warner Bros. / W 0089T United Kingdom (1992)
1. "The Blood That Moves the Body" (The Gun mix) – 4:15
2. "The Blood That Moves the Body" (Two-Time Gun mix) – 4:17
3. "The Blood That Moves the Body" (The Second Gun Around mix) – 5:56

Remixes by Alan Tarney.

- CD single: Warner Bros. / W 0089CD United Kingdom (1992)
1. "The Blood That Moves the Body" (The Gun mix) – 4:15
2. "The Blood That Moves the Body" (Two-Time Gun mix) – 4:17
3. "The Blood That Moves the Body" (The Second Gun Around mix) – 5:56

== Charts ==
Weekly chart performance for "The Blood That Moves the Body"
Chart (1988)	Peak position
Belgium (Ultratop 50 Flanders)	16
Europe (Eurochart Hot 100 Singles)	36
Iceland (Íslenski Listinn Topp 10)	1
Ireland (IRMA)	11
Italy (Musica e dischi)	13
Italy Airplay (Music & Media)	3
Netherlands (Dutch Top 40)	28
Netherlands (Single Top 100)	24
South Africa (Springbok Radio)	11
Switzerland (Schweizer Hitparade)	29
UK Singles (Official Charts)	25
West Germany (GfK)	23

=== Year-end charts ===
1988 Year-end chart performance for "The Blood That Moves the Body"
Chart (1988)	Position
South Africa (SA Singles Charts)	62

1989 Year-end chart performance for "The Blood That Moves the Body"
Chart (1989)	Position
South Africa (SA Singles Charts)	19
