= The Living Daylights (soundtrack) =

Soundtrack album by John Barry
- Released: 11 May 1987
- Recorded: 1987
- Genres: Synth-pop, Film Score
- Label: Warner Bros.
- Producers: Paul O'Duffy, Jason Corsaro

Singles from The Living Daylights
- 1. "The Living Daylights" Released: 22 June 1987; 2. "If There Was a Man" Released: 3 August 1987

The Living Daylights is the 1987 soundtrack for the James Bond film The Living Daylights and the eleventh and final Bond soundtrack to be scored by composer John Barry. The soundtrack is notable for its introduction of sequenced electronic rhythm tracks overdubbed with the orchestra – at the time, a relatively new innovation.

The title song of the film, "The Living Daylights", was recorded by Norwegian pop group A-ha. As of 2017 this is the only Bond film where the title song has not been performed by either British or American artists. A-ha and Barry did not collaborate well, resulting in two versions of the theme song. Barry's film mix is heard on the soundtrack and on various A-ha best-of compilations. The A-ha preferred mix can be heard on their 1988 album Stay on These Roads. However, in 2006 A-ha's Paul Waaktaar complimented Barry's contributions "I loved the stuff he added to the track, I mean it gave it this really cool string arrangement. That's when, for me, it started to sound like a Bond thing".

In a departure from conventions of previous Bond films, the film uses different songs over the opening and end credits. The song heard over the end credits, "If There Was a Man" - which acts as the film's "love theme" - was one of two songs performed for the film by the Pretenders. The other song, "Where Has Everybody Gone", is heard as source music in the film from Necros's Walkman. The Pretenders were originally considered to perform the film's title song. However, the producers had been pleased with the commercial success of Duran Duran's "A View to a Kill", and felt that a-ha would be more likely to make an impact in the charts. Upon release, "The Living Daylights" was a hit in many countries.

The original soundtrack released by Warner Bros. Records featured only 12 tracks. Later re-releases by Rykodisc and EMI added nine additional tracks, including an alternate instrumental end credits score.

== Leitmotifs ==
Composer John Barry utilises eight leitmotifs on the soundtrack, that recurs in two or more of the tracks listed. Two of them are pinned to location, three are pinned to characters Necros (Andreas Wisniewski), Kara Milovy (Maryam d'Abo) and General Georgi Koskov (Jeroen Krabbé), one is pinned to the title song by A-ha, one is pinned to the Mujahideen and one is the Monty Norman "James Bond Theme".

The Living Daylights Theme

- 1. "The Living Daylights"
- 9. "Hercules Takes Off"
- 15. "Murder at the Fair" (1:14–1:37)
- 16. ""Assassin" and Drugged" (0:34–1:25)

Necros' Theme

- 2. "Necros Attacks"
- 7. "Where Has Everybody Gone"
- 11. "Inflight Fight"
- 15. "Murder at the Fair" (0:12–1:13)
- 16. ""Assassin" and Drugged" (0:00–0:13)
- 18. "Afghanistan Plan" (0:33–0:42, 1:20–1:36, 2:07–2:23)

Mujahedin Theme

- 3. "The Sniper Was a Woman" (1:10–2:30)
- 10. "Mujahadin and Opium"
- 17. "Airbase Jailbreak" (1:35–4:38)

James Bond Theme

- 4. "Ice Chase"
- 6. "Koskov Escapes" (1:36-2:12)
- 13. "Exercise at Gibraltar" (0:00–0:22, 1:44–1:51, 2:59–5:43)
- 20. "Final Confrontation" (0:00–0:30)

Kara's Theme

- 5. "Kara Meets Bond"
- 14. "Approaching Kara" (0:00–1:23)

Koskov's Theme

- 6. "Koskov Escapes" (0:48–1:16)
- 17. "Airbase Jailbreak" (0:00–0:34)

Vienna Theme / If There Was a Man

- 8. "Into Vienna"
- 12. "If There Was a Man"
- 14. "Approaching Kara" (1:23–2:22)
- 21. "Alternate End Titles"

Afghanistan Theme

- 13. "Exercise at Gibraltar" (2:00–2:18)
- 16. ""Assassin" and Drugged" (0:00–0:18)
- 17. "Airbase Jailbreak" (0:34–1:35)

== Track listing ==
1. "The Living Daylights" – A-ha
2. "Necros Attacks"
3. "The Sniper Was a Woman"
4. "Ice Chase" (Note: contains the "James Bond Theme", originally composed for the Dr. No soundtrack)
5. "Kara Meets Bond"
6. "Koskov Escapes"
7. "Where Has Everybody Gone" – Pretenders
8. "Into Vienna"
9. "Hercules Takes Off"
10. "Mujahadin and Opium"
11. "Inflight Fight"
12. "If There Was a Man" – Pretenders
13. "Exercise at Gibraltar"
14. "Approaching Kara"
15. "Murder at the Fair"
16. ""Assassin" and Drugged"
17. "Airbase Jailbreak"
18. "Afghanistan Plan"
19. "Air Bond"
20. "Final Confrontation"
21. "Alternate End Titles"

In addition to the above, the film features a number of pieces of classical music – naturally, since it involves an international-standard cellist in Kara Milovy. Wolfgang Amadeus Mozart's 40th Symphony in G minor (1st movement only; the concert's interval oddly comes after this movement and not the finale) is being performed by the orchestra at the Conservatoire in Bratislava when Koskov defects. As Miss Moneypenny (Caroline Bliss) relates to James Bond (Timothy Dalton), Kara is next to perform Alexander Borodin's String Quartet in D major and 007 joins a small audience and tells Kara afterwards that her performance was "exquisite". Antonín Dvořák's cello concerto in B minor and Mozart's Le nozze di Figaro (in Vienna) also feature. At the end of the film, Kara performs Pyotr Ilyich Tchaikovsky's Rococo Variations before a rapturous audience including M (Robert Brown) and General Anatol Gogol (Walter Gotell) but not Kamran Shah (Art Malik), who arrives too late. The audience also includes Bond though Kara does not know it until he surprises her in her dressing room afterwards.

== See also ==
- Outline of James Bond
