= Celice (song) =

Single by A-ha

from the album Analogue
- Released: 4 October 2005
- Recorded: 2005
- Genre: New wave; alternative rock
- Length: 3:28
- Label: Polydor
- Songwriters: Magne Furuholmen; Martin Terefe
- Producer: Martin Terefe

A-ha singles chronology
"The Sun Always Shines on T.V." (2003)	"Celice" (2005)	"Birthright" (2005)

Music video
- "Celice" on YouTube

"Celice" is a song by Norwegian synth-pop band A-ha. Written by Magne Furuholmen and Martin Terefe, it was released as the first single from the album, Analogue, throughout Europe. It was released on 7 October 2005 in Germany and Norway, and 24 October in Sweden. It was not released in the UK. It reached worldwide sales of over 300,000 units. For a while the song was under consideration to be included on the Da Vinci Code movie soundtrack. It was A-ha's eighth and is their most recent number-one hit in Norway.

== Track listing ==
1. "Celice" (Radio Cut)
2. "Celice" (Live at Frognerparken)
3. "Celice" (Paul van Dyk's Radio Edit)
4. "The Summers of Our Youth"
5. "Celice" (music video)

=== The Remixes ===
1. "Celice" Radio Cut (3:28)
2. "Celice" Thomas Schumacher Remix (7:53)
3. "Celice" Boris Dlugosch Remix (6:38)
4. "Celice" Paul van Dyk's Extended Mix (5:42)
5. "Celice" Paul van Dyk's Vocalized Clubmix (8:07).

== Music video ==
The video for the song was directed by Jörn Heitmann, famous for directing the videos of Rammstein, and was filmed in a brothel in Berlin. It was considered controversial by fans and the media due to its strong adult content, featuring topics not as clear in A-ha videos before; sex, drugs, suicide, prostitution, and alcohol had never been so prominently featured in the band's videos, although sadomasochism had been noted in the previous release, "Move to Memphis". Heat sensors are used to show some of the more graphic images from the video.

One Norwegian newspaper held the headline, "Raw sex in A-ha video" after the video was officially released on September 24, 2005. As of June 2026, the music video, uploaded in September 2010 on their official YouTube channel, has received over 796 thousand views.

Describing the video, Furuholmen said: "The video is about people who have lost their direction in the hunt for meaning - and loneliness as a result of lost innocence."

== Charts ==
=== Weekly charts ===
Weekly chart performance for "Celice"
Chart (2005)	Peak position
Austria (Ö3 Austria Top 40)	41
Belgium (Ultratip Bubbling Under Flanders)	9
Belgium (Ultratip Bubbling Under Wallonia)	6
Finland (Suomen virallinen lista)	15
Germany (GfK)	21
Italy (FIMI)	36
Norway (VG-lista)	1
Switzerland (Schweizer Hitparade)	38

=== Year-end charts ===
Year-end chart performance for "Celice"
Chart (2005)	Position
Russia Airplay (TopHit)	110
