= Dark Is the Night for All =

Single by A-ha

from the album Memorial Beach
- B-side: "I've Been Losing You"/"Cry Wolf" (live); "Angel in the Snow" (instrumental)
- Released: 24 May 1993
- Studio: Paisley Park, Chanhassen, Minnesota, US
- Genre: Alternative rock
- Length: 3:46
- Label: Warner Bros.
- Songwriter: Pål Waaktaar
- Producers: David Z; A-ha

A-ha singles chronology
"Move to Memphis" (1991)	"Dark Is the Night for All" (1993)	"Angel" (1993)

Music video
- "Dark Is the Night for All" on YouTube

"Dark Is the Night for All" is a song by Norwegian synth-pop band A-ha, released on 24 May 1993 by Warner Bros. as the lead single from their fifth studio album, Memorial Beach (1993). The single version of the song is only named "Dark Is the Night". The song was written by Pål Waaktaar and produced by the band with David Z. Like the rest of Memorial Beach album, the song was recorded at Prince's Paisley Park Studios. This was also the last A-ha single to be released in the United States. There are two versions of the accompanying music video, directed by Erick Ifergan; the first version was banned due to disturbing scenes, including Morten Harket's face ripping through the skin of his abdomen. The second version features more scenes of the band. Overall, the video shows people in various forms of bondage and reflects the dark time A-ha was going through at the time.

== Critical reception ==
Upon the release, pan-European magazine Music & Media wrote, "Like Depeche Mode, A-ha is no longer strictly synth. A little bit of rock is injected, while the vocals are Bono-esque." Alan Jones from Music Week said, "The Norwegian former teen idols return, this time sounding rather like a low-rent but pleasant U2 hybrid." He added that the song is "less immediate but more substantial than much of their work", and "a grower that could do very well." Tony Cross from Smash Hits gave it a score of three out of five and commented, "After disappearing up a Fjord for a few years, Morten is back – as Bono! This U2-esque blockbuster is immediately appealing – with its quiet piano, soft and sad-sounding Morten, and a grand sweeping guitar riff that is immediately likeable." In the review of Memorial Beach two weeks later, Cross also named "Dark Is the Night for All" the "best thing" on the album.

== Track listings ==
- 7-inch single
1. "Dark Is the Night for All" (album version) – 3:45
2. "Angel in the Snow" (instrumental) – 4:15
- CD 1
1. "Dark Is the Night for All" – 3:44
2. "I've Been Losing You"/"Cry Wolf" (live) – 9:07
3. "Angel in the Snow" (instrumental) – 4:15
- CD 2
1. "Dark Is the Night for All" – 3:45
2. "The Sun Always Shines on T.V." – 5:06
3. "Hunting High and Low" (remix) – 3:38
4. "Crying in the Rain" – 4:25

== Charts ==
Chart performance for "Dark Is the Night for All"
Chart (1993)	Peak position
Australia (ARIA)	165
Belgium (Ultratop 50 Flanders)	45
Canada Top Singles (RPM)	70
Europe (Eurochart Hot 100)	37
Europe (European Hit Radio)	10
Germany (GfK)	46
Iceland (Íslenski Listinn Topp 40)	38
Ireland (IRMA)	28
Israel (Israeli Singles Chart)	10
Norway (VG-lista)	4
UK Singles (Official Charts)	19
UK Airplay (Music Week)	22
US Bubbling Under Hot 100 (Billboard)	11
