= Move to Memphis =

Single by A-ha

from the album Headlines and Deadlines: The Hits of A-ha
- B-side: "Crying in the Rain" (Live)
- Released: 14 October 1991
- Length: 4:15
- Label: Warner Bros.
- Songwriters: Paul Waaktaar-Savoy; Magne Furuholmen
- Producer: A-ha

A-ha singles chronology
"Waiting for Her" (1991)	"Move to Memphis" (1991)	"Dark Is the Night for All" (1993)

Music video
- "Move to Memphis" on YouTube

"Move to Memphis" is a song by Norwegian synth-pop band A-ha, which was released in October 1991 by Warner Bros. Records as a single from their greatest hits album Headlines and Deadlines: The Hits of A-ha (1991). It was written by Paul Waaktaar-Savoy and Magne Furuholmen, and produced by A-ha. "Move to Memphis" reached number two in Norway and number 47 in the United Kingdom.

In 1991, A-ha had started writing new material for their fifth studio album Memorial Beach when A-ha's label, Warner Bros., suggested releasing a compilation album. The label wanted the band to provide one or two new songs for the compilation and "Move to Memphis" was then recorded for inclusion on the album. To promote its release as a single, a music video was filmed, directed by Erick Ifergan and starring French actress Beatrice Dalle. A new version of the song would appear on Memorial Beach, released in 1993. It was produced by David Z and A-ha.

== Track listings ==
- 7-inch single
1. "Move to Memphis" – 4:15
2. "Crying in the Rain" (Live) – 4:46
- 12-inch single
1. "Move to Memphis" (Extended Version) – 6:39
2. "I've Been Losing You" (Live) – 4:57
3. "East of the Sun" (Live) – 4:11
4. "(Seemingly) Non-Stop July" (Live) – 3:00
- Cassette single
1. "Move to Memphis" – 4:15
2. "Crying in the Rain" (Live) – 4:46
- German promotional cassette single
1. "Move to Memphis" – 4:15
2. "Move to Memphis" (Extended Version) – 6:39
- CD single
1. "Move to Memphis" – 4:17
2. "Crying in the Rain" (Live) – 4:52
3. "Early Morning" (Live) – 3:03
4. "Manhattan Skyline" (Live) – 7:07
- Japanese CD single
1. "Move to Memphis" – 4:16
2. "Crying in the Rain" (Live) – 4:52

== Personnel ==
A-ha

- Morten Harket – vocals
- Paul Waaktaar-Savoy – guitars, bass
- Magne Furuholmen – keyboards

Production

- A-ha – production
- Gregg Jackman – mixing

Other

- Stylorouge – sleeve design
- Just Loomis – photography

== Charts ==
Chart performance for "Move to Memphis"
Chart (1991)	Peak position
Australia (ARIA)	171
Europe (Eurochart Hot 100)	54
Europe (European Hit Radio)	29
Germany (GfK)	39
Iceland (Íslenski Listinn Topp 10)	7
Ireland (IRMA)	29
Luxembourg (Radio Luxembourg)	13
Netherlands (Single Top 100)	61
Netherlands (Tipparade)	12
Norway (VG-lista)	2
UK Singles (Official Charts)	47
UK Airplay (Music Week)	28
