= You Are the One (A-ha song) =

Single by A-ha

from the album Stay on These Roads
- B-side: "Out of Blue Comes Green" (album version)
- Released: 21 November 1988
- Length: 3:51; 6:32 (12" remix); 3:45 (7" remix)
- Label: Warner Bros.
- Songwriters: Pål Waaktaar; Magne Furuholmen
- Producer: Alan Tarney

A-ha singles chronology
"Touchy!" (1988)	"You Are the One" (1988)	"There's Never a Forever Thing" (1989)

Audio sample
- "You Are the One": file; help

Music video
- "You Are the One" on YouTube

"You Are the One" is a song by Norwegian synth-pop band A-ha, released as the fourth single from their third studio album, Stay on These Roads (1988). It was remixed by Justin Strauss for single release. The music video was filmed in New York City.

== Music video ==
The music video was shot in New York and includes scenes from and around the Moondance Diner. The Moondance Diner was a diner in the SoHo neighborhood of Manhattan, New York City, located at 88 Sixth Avenue, between Grand Street and Canal Street.

== Critical reception ==
A review in Pan-European magazine Music & Media stated: "After the heaviness of "Blood" this is the perfect follow-up to "Touchy". A lighthearted and immensely likeable song".

== Track listings ==
- UK 7-inch single: Warner Bros. / W 7636
1. "You Are the One" (remix) – 3:47
2. "Out of Blue Comes Green" (album version) – 6:41

Track 1 was remixed by Justin Strauss.

- UK 12-inch single: Warner Bros. / W 7636T United Kingdom
1. "You Are the One" (12″ remix) – 6:31
2. "You Are the One" (instrumental) – 3:56
3. "Out of Blue Comes Green" (album version) – 6:41

Also released as a 12-inch picture disc (W 7636TP).
Track 1 was remixed by Justin Strauss.

- UK CD single: Warner Bros. / W 7636CD
1. "You Are the One" (7″ remix) – 3:47
2. "Scoundrel Days" (album version) – 3:56
3. "Out of Blue Comes Green" (album version) – 6:41

== Charts ==
Chart performance for "You Are the One"
Chart (1988–1989)	Peak position
Belgium (Ultratop 50 Flanders)	22
Europe (Eurochart Hot 100 Singles)	44
France (SNEP)	21
Ireland (IRMA)	12
Netherlands (Single Top 100)	56
UK Singles (OCC)	13
West Germany (GfK)	30
