= Train of Thought (A-ha song) =

Single by a-ha

from the album Hunting High and Low
- B-side: "And You Tell Me" (demo version)
- Released: 24 March 1986
- Recorded: 1985
- Length: 4:14 (album version); 4:17 (single remix); 7:04 (U.S. mix); 8:34 (dub mix)
- Label: Warner Bros.
- Songwriter: Pål Waaktaar
- Producer: Tony Mansfield

A-ha singles chronology
"The Sun Always Shines on T.V." (1985)	"Train of Thought" (1986)	"Hunting High and Low" (1986)

Music video
- "Train of Thought" on YouTube

"Train of Thought" is a song by the Norwegian synth-pop band a-ha, released on 24 March 1986 by Warner Bros. Records as the fourth single from their debut studio album, Hunting High and Low (1985). The lyrics for this song were based on the existentialist authors and poets Gunvor Hofmo, Knut Hamsun and Fyodor Dostoevsky – Pål Waaktaar's favourites at the time.

It was a-ha's third consecutive top-10 single in the UK, reaching number eight. It was not a pop hit in the United States, but a 12-inch single featuring a remix of the song appeared on the Hot Dance Club Play charts. The single sold 500,000 copies worldwide. Another remix by Steve Thompson was released in 1986.

== Music video ==
The music video was directed by Candice Reckinger and Michael Patterson. The video concept was designed by the same producers who brought "Take On Me" into the video mainstream. The black-and-white footage and animation in the "Train of Thought" video actually predated the "Take On Me" single, and was the inspiration for the animation in the "Take On Me" video. It originated as Patterson's student film at the California Institute of the Arts called Commuter, which went on to influence a generation of MTV videos.

Most of the video was the old animated footage, interspersed with live parts with a-ha filmed during a break in the band's tour.

== Track listings ==
7-inch single: Warner Bros. / W 8736 United Kingdom

1. "Train of Thought" (remix) – 4:14
2. "And You Tell Me" (original version) – 1:51
- Track 1 is remixed by Alan Tarney and John Hudson.
- Track 1 is also known as "remix 7″ version" and is remixed by Alan Tarney and John Hudson.

12-inch single: Warner Bros. / W 8736 T United Kingdom

1. "Train of Thought" (U.S. mix) – 7:04
2. "And You Tell Me" (original version) – 1:51
3. "Train of Thought" (remix 7″ version) – 4:14
- Track 1 is also known as "Steve Thompson mix".
- Track 3 is also known as "remix" and is remixed by Alan Tarney and John Hudson.

7-inch single: Reprise / 928 736-7 Europe

1. "Train of Thought" (album version) – 4:14
2. "And You Tell Me" (demo version) – 1:51
- Track 1 is mixed by Alan Tarney and produced by Tony Mansfield.

12-inch single: Reprise / 0-20455 New Zealand

1. "Train of Thought" (Steve Thompson mix) – 7:04
2. "Train of Thought" (dub version) – 8:31
3. "Train of Thought" (remix) – 4:14
4. "And You Tell Me" (demo version) – 1:51
- Track 1 is also known as "U.S. mix".
- Track 3 is also known as "remix 7″ version" and is remixed by Alan Tarney and John Hudson.

Note:

- The original version of "Train of Thought" produced by Tony Mansfield can be found on the Hunting High and Low album.

== Charts ==
Chart performance for "Train of Thought"
Chart (1986)	Peak position
Australia (Kent Music Report)	47
Belgium (Ultratop 50 Flanders)	22
Europe (European Hot 100 Singles)	10
Ireland (IRMA)	5
New Zealand (Recorded Music NZ)	28
UK Singles (OCC)	8
West Germany (GfK)	14
