= Touchy! =

Single by A-ha

from the album Stay on These Roads
- B-side: "Hurry Home; "Hunting High and Low"
- Released: 15 August 1988
- Length: 4:38
- Label: Warner Bros.
- Songwriters: Pål Waaktaar; Magne Furuholmen; Morten Harket
- Producer: Alan Tarney

A-ha singles chronology
"The Blood That Moves the Body" (1988)	"Touchy!" (1988)	"You Are the One" (1988)

Music video
- "Touchy!" on YouTube

"Touchy!" (also known simply as "Touchy") is a song by Norwegian synth-pop band A-ha, released on 15 August 1988 as the third single from their third studio album, Stay on These Roads (1988).

== Critical reception ==
Pan-European magazine Music & Media wrote, "Being tipped by many Euro-DJs for months now, this highly commercial track just cannot fail."

== Music video ==
The accompanying music video for "Touchy!" was directed by Kevin Moloney in France, and shows the band at a beach resort, interspersed with black-and-white footage of singer Morten Harket and the other members miming the song.

== Track listings ==
- 7-inch single: Warner Bros. / W 7749 United Kingdom
1. "Touchy!" – 4:38
2. "Hurry Home" (album version) – 4:34
- 12-inch single: Warner Bros. / W 7749T United Kingdom
1. "Touchy!" (Go-Go mix) – 8:20
2. "Touchy!" (album version) – 4:38
3. "Hurry Home" (album version) – 4:34
- CD single: Warner Bros. / W 7749CD United Kingdom
1. "Touchy!" (Go-Go mix) – 8:20
2. "Hurry Home" (album version) – 4:34
3. "Hunting High and Low" (edit) – 3:47

== Charts ==
Weekly chart performance for "Touchy!"
Chart (1988)	Peak position
Belgium (Ultratop 50 Flanders)	14
Europe (Eurochart Hot 100 Singles)	23
Europe (European Airplay Top 50)	1
Finland (Suomen virallinen lista)	25
France (SNEP)	5
Ireland (IRMA)	6
Italy (Musica e dischi)	23
Netherlands (Dutch Top 40)	14
Netherlands (Single Top 100)	13
Switzerland (Schweizer Hitparade)	18
UK Singles (Official Charts)	11
West Germany (GfK)	13

Year-end chart performance for "Touchy!"
Chart (1988)	Position
Europe (European Airplay Top 50)	28
France (IFOP)	40
