= Stay on These Roads =

Studio album by A-ha
- Released: 3 May 1988
- Recorded: 1987–1988
- Studios: RG Jones, London
- Genre: Synth-pop
- Length: 43:40; 145:16 (deluxe edition)
- Label: Warner Bros.
- Producer: Alan Tarney

A-ha chronology
Scoundrel Days (1986)	Stay on These Roads (1988)	East of the Sun, West of the Moon (1990)

Singles from Stay on These Roads
- 1. "The Living Daylights" Released: 22 June 1987; 2. "Stay on These Roads" Released: 14 March 1988; 3. "The Blood That Moves the Body" Released: 6 June 1988; 4. "Touchy!" Released: 15 August 1988; 5. "You Are the One" Released: 21 November 1988

Stay on These Roads is the third studio album by Norwegian synth-pop band a-ha, released on 3 May 1988 by Warner Bros. Records. Six singles were released from the album.

== Recording ==
A Synclavier, Sequential Circuits Prophet 5, Yamaha DX-7, Roland D-50, and Roland Juno-60 or Roland Juno-106 synthesizers were used in the recording of this album, as was a Yamaha RX-5 drum machine.

== Release and reception ==
Professional ratings
Review scores
Source	Rating
AllMusic	2/5 stars
The Encyclopedia of Popular Music	3/5 stars
Number One	4.5/5 stars
Q	2/5 stars
Record Mirror	3/5 stars
New Musical Express	7.8/10 stars

The album peaked at number 148 on the US Billboard 200. It was another big hit by A-ha internationally, selling over 4 million copies worldwide. Stay on These Roads achieved Platinum status in Brazil and Gold in the UK, Switzerland, the Netherlands and Germany and Double Platinum status in France. It reached number two in the European top-100 albums sales chart.

William Ruhlmann of AllMusic said "in the U.K., the album became the group's third straight to peak at number two, though it charted for a shorter period than the first two albums, and there were four Top 25 hits—the title track, 'The Blood That Moves the Body,' 'Touchy!,' and 'You Are the One'." Also included was a re-recording of A-ha's 1987 theme from the James Bond movie The Living Daylights, which, in its single version, was a U.K. number five that missed the U.S. charts. In the positive review of the NME, David Quantick writes : "Life is sad and so is Pal Waaktaar. Pal, writer or co-writer of all these songs, seems over-run by melancholy. His lyrics are about crying, going away and yearning, and even the happier songs seem riddled with resignation rather than out-and-out pop joy".

Lead single "Stay on These Roads", number one in Norway, was a hit across Europe, including top-five showings in the UK, France, Austria and Ireland and top-ten chartings in Germany, the Netherlands, Sweden and Switzerland. Stay on These Roads includes three more hit singles, "The Blood That Moves The Body", "Touchy!" and "You Are the One", though a final single, "There's Never a Forever Thing", was released only in Brazil.

== Track listing ==
Side one
No.	Title	Writer(s)	Length
1.	"Stay on These Roads"	Furuholmen, Harket, Waaktaar	4:45
2.	"The Blood That Moves the Body"	Waaktaar	4:07
3.	"Touchy!"	Furuholmen, Harket, Waaktaar	4:38
4.	"This Alone Is Love"	Furuholmen, Waaktaar	5:16
5.	"Hurry Home"	Furuholmen, Waaktaar	4:38
Total length:			23:21

Side two
No.	Title	Writer(s)	Length
1.	"The Living Daylights"	Waaktaar, Barry	4:46
2.	"There's Never a Forever Thing"	Waaktaar	2:52
3.	"Out of Blue Comes Green"	Waaktaar	6:43
4.	"You Are the One"	Waaktaar, Furuholmen	3:51
5.	"You'll End Up Crying"	Waaktaar	2:07
Total length:			20:19

=== 2015 Deluxe Edition ===
Disc one
No.	Title	Writer(s)	Length
1.	"Stay on These Roads"	Furuholmen, Harket, Waaktaar	4:46
2.	"The Blood That Moves the Body"	Waaktaar	4:08
3.	"Touchy!"	Furuholmen, Harket, Waaktaar	4:34
4.	"This Alone Is Love"	Furuholmen, Waaktaar	5:16
5.	"Hurry Home"	Furuholmen, Waaktaar	4:36
6.	"The Living Daylights"	Waaktaar, Barry	4:48
7.	"There's Never a Forever Thing"	Waaktaar	2:52
8.	"Out of Blue Comes Green"	Waaktaar	6:45
9.	"You Are the One"	Waaktaar, Furuholmen	3:51
10.	"You'll End Up Crying"	Waaktaar	2:10
11.	"Stay on These Roads" (Extended remix)	Furuholmen, Harket, Waaktaar	6:12
12.	"You Are the One" (Remix)	Waaktaar, Furuholmen	6:32
13.	"The Living Daylights" (Extended version)	Waaktaar, Barry	6:55
14.	"The Blood That Moves the Body" (Extended remix)	Waaktaar	5:23
15.	"Touchy!" (Go-Go Mix)	Furuholmen, Harket, Waaktaar	8:23
Total length:			76:25

Disc two: Demos and alternate versions
No.	Title	Writer(s)	Length
1.	"Stay on These Roads" (Early version)	Furuholmen, Harket, Waaktaar	4:41
2.	"The Blood That Moves the Body" (demo)	Waaktaar	3:40
3.	"Touchy!" (Original mix)	Furuholmen, Harket, Waaktaar	4:38
4.	"This Alone Is Love" (demo)	Waaktaar, Furuholmen	5:02
5.	"You Are the One" (Early version)	Waaktaar, Furuholmen	3:51
6.	"Cold River" (1987 demo)	Waaktaar, Lauren Savoy	3:15
7.	"Hurry Home" (demo)	Waaktaar, Furuholmen	3:17
8.	"I'll Never Find Streetful City" (demo)	Furuholmen	2:30
9.	"The Living Daylights" (demo)	Waaktaar, Barry	5:01
10.	"There's Never a Forever Thing" (demo)	Waaktaar	3:08
11.	"Out of Blue Comes Green" (Alternative mix)	Waaktaar	4:31
12.	"You'll End Up Crying" (demo)	Waaktaar	2:02
13.	"You Are the One" (Alternate version)	Waaktaar, Furuholmen	3:59
14.	"Touchy!" (demo)	Furuholmen, Harket, Waaktaar	3:41
15.	"Umbrella" (Rendezvous demo)	Waaktaar	3:02
16.	"Thus Ended Our Love Affair" (demo)	Waaktaar	3:02
17.	"There's Never a Forever Thing" (Acoustic version)	Waaktaar	2:47
18.	"Evitar" (demo)	Waaktaar	4:38
19.	"You Are the One" (demo)	Waaktaar, Furuholmen	2:54
20.	"Sail on My Love" (Writing session)	Furuholmen, Harket, Waaktaar	2:32
Total length:			68:51

== Personnel ==
A-ha

- Morten Harket – lead and backing vocals
- Magne Furuholmen – keyboards, bass and drum programming, backing vocals
- Paul Waaktaar – guitars, strings, bass and drum programming, backing vocals

- Contributions to the recording of the album: Steve Sidwell, Ben Robbins, Anne Dudley, Randy Hope-Taylor, Øystein Jevanord, Kick Horns.

Production and Technical

- Alan Tarney – producer
- Gerry Kitchingham – recording engineer
- John Hudson – mixing
- Jeri Heiden – art direction
- Just Loomis – band photography
- Stuart Watson – "still life" photography

== Charts ==
=== Weekly charts ===
Weekly chart performance for Stay on These Roads
Chart (1988)	Peak position
Argentinian Albums (CAPIF)	4
Australian Albums (Australian Music Report)	52
Austrian Albums (Ö3 Austria)	9
Brazilian Albums (NOPEM)	2
Canada Top Albums/CDs (RPM)	55
Dutch Albums (Album Top 100)	5
European Albums (Music & Media)	2
Finnish Albums (Suomen virallinen lista)	12
French Albums (IFOP)	3
German Albums (Offizielle Top 100)	4
Icelandic Albums (Tónlist)	1
Italian Albums (Musica e dischi)	2
New Zealand Albums (RMNZ)	36
Norwegian Albums (VG-lista)	1
Spanish Albums (AFYVE)	18
Swedish Albums (Sverigetopplistan)	10
Swiss Albums (Schweizer Hitparade)	6
UK Albums (Official Charts)	2
US Billboard 200	148

=== Year-end charts ===
Year-end chart performance for Stay on These Roads
Chart (1988)	Position
Dutch Albums (Album Top 100)	51
European Albums (Music & Media)	16
German Albums (Offizielle Top 100)	21
French Albums (IFOP)	11
Italian Albums (FIMI)	27

== Certifications and sales ==
Certifications and sales for Stay on These Roads
Region	Certification	Certified units/sales
Brazil (Pro-Música Brasil)	2×Platinum	500,000
France (SNEP)	Platinum	862,000
Germany (BVMI)	Gold	250,000^{^}
Netherlands (NVPI)	Gold	50,000^{^}
Norway	—	85,000
Spain (Promusicae)	Platinum	100,000^{^}
Switzerland (IFPI Switzerland)	Gold	25,000^{^}
United Kingdom (BPI)	Gold	100,000^{^}
^{*} Sales figures based on certification alone.^{^} Shipments figures based on certification alone.
