= Stay on These Roads (song) =

Single by A-ha

from the album Stay on These Roads
- B-side: "Soft Rains of April" (Original Mix)
- Released: 14 March 1988
- Length: 4:45; 6:12 (extended remix)
- Label: Warner Bros.
- Songwriters: Pål Waaktaar; Magne Furuholmen; Morten Harket
- Producer: Alan Tarney

A-ha singles chronology
"The Living Daylights" (1987)	"Stay on These Roads" (1988)	"The Blood That Moves the Body" (1988)

Music video
- "Stay on These Roads" on YouTube

"Stay on These Roads" is a song by Norwegian synth-pop band A-ha, released on 14 March 1988 by Warner Bros. Records as the lead single from their third studio album of the same name (1988). It succeeded their previous single, "The Living Daylights", which was recorded by the band for the title theme for the James Bond film of the same name in 1987.

== Background and release ==
A Roland D-50 was used on this song —the sound patch is called "Staccato Heaven"— the wind sound during the instrumental was made on either a Roland Juno 60 or Juno 106 synthesizer. The versions on the 7" vinyl and the 3" CD single ("7 inch Version") are identical to the album version. The 7" single cover montage includes a blurred picture of actress Susan Sullivan, taken from a publicity shot from the TV series, Falcon Crest, in which she appeared as Maggie Gioberti. It is not known why this picture is used.

The song achieved success in many European countries, becoming the most successful single from the Stay on These Roads album, along with "The Living Daylights" on the UK charts. Though it did not hit the national charts in the United States, the song was a significant hit across Europe. It went to number seven in West Germany, number three in France and Iceland, and number two in Ireland. In Norway, the song was the band's fourth number one single. "Stay on These Roads" was A-ha's seventh and final top five showing in the United Kingdom, reaching number five on the chart edition of March 27, 1988. It would also prove their last top ten hit in the country for almost two decades, as they did not score another UK top ten hit until eighteen years later in 2006. The song's music video was directed by Andy Morahan.

== Writing ==
All three band members – Morten Harket, Magne Furuholmen and Paul Waaktaar-Savoy – contributed towards the writing of "Stay on These Roads". Despite Furuholmen describing as the Stay on These Roads album as a "hard album to make", the band credit the song as one they are "particularly proud of" and acknowledging the song to be "live set mainstays, drawing exhuberant audience participation every night".

Lyrically, the song uses cold weather as a metaphor to symbolise challenges and difficulties that a person can experience in life. The lyrics of the song create a sense of perseverance to the listener, with an underlying message of "staying strong in the face of adversity, with the idea that despite the hardships, there is hope and the possibility of meeting again in a better place".

Pal Waaktaar-Savoy, one of the bands songwriting partners, had been inspired about the song from his long-distance relationship with his wife, Lauren. As a result, the lyrics to "Stay on These Roads" are credited with "encouraging perseverance, assuring that love will endure despite physical separation".

== Critical reception ==
"Stay on These Roads" was well-received by critics. Paul Oldfield from Melody Maker wrote, "a-Ha ascend immediately into the hard-gloss satellite-beam Pet-Shops' circuit. "Stay" enlarges until it almost comes to a halt, full of simulated draughts and statuary, gravity and despondence that's bigger than Europe. Nobody will notice, though." Jerry Smith of Music Week considered "Stay on These Roads" as "one of their typically ponderous and overly dramatic numbers [...] but it lacks the commercial edge of previous singles". A review in Pan-European Music & Media magazine stated: "This song needs repeated play to fully appreciate its impact, after that, you can't get it out of your head. A ballad with a slow and commanding build-up, sporting a subtle melody giving singer Morten Harket all room to show his unique vocal qualities".

Edwin Pouncey from NME said, "A road to nowhere presumably, with no end in sight. File under has-beens." In a review published in Smash Hits, English synth-pop duo Erasure were highly critical of the song, saying it was "far too manufactured and over-produced", with "no tune to it, nothing that makes you want to sing along to it", just good to be a "stadium song", and concluded that "it's a real shame". Cash Box said that "ethereal, arching vocals elevate this ballad into greatness, creating a mood that does not easily leave you."

== Legacy ==
In 2024, Smooth Radio placed "Stay on These Roads" at number five in a listing of the top ten best A-ha songs of all time. In their review, the radio station acknowledges the song as being "a haunting synthpop ballad that transcends the icy grip of despair", and claims that the song "weaves layers of human experience, resilience, and unwavering companionship". Additionally, they claimed that "the song serves as a quiet anthem for endurance, resonating with those burdened by adversity".

== Live performances ==
A-ha played the song at Oslo Spektrum on 21 August 2011, performing for a national memorial service dedicated to the victims of the 2011 Norway attacks. In 2017, A-ha appeared on the television series MTV Unplugged and played and recorded acoustic versions of many of their popular songs for the album MTV Unplugged – Summer Solstice in Giske, Norway, including "Stay on These Roads".

== Music video ==
The music video accompanying the song's release was directed by Andy Morahan, with its location footage filmed on England's East Anglia coast at Aldeburgh, Suffolk.

== Track listings ==
- 7-inch single: Warner Bros. / W 7936 United Kingdom
1. "Stay on These Roads" – 4:46
2. "Soft Rains of April" (original mix) – 3:18

Track 1 is the album version.

- 12-inch single: Warner Bros. / W 7936T United Kingdom
1. "Stay on These Roads" (extended remix) – 6:08
2. "Soft Rains of April" (original mix) – 3:18

Also released as a 12-inch picture disc (W 8405TP).

- 7-inch single: Warner Bros. / 7-27886 United States
1. "Stay on These Roads" (U.S. 7″ edit) – 3:54
2. "You'll End Up Crying" – 3:18

Track 1 is exclusive to this version.

- CD single: Warner Bros. / W 7936CD United Kingdom
1. "Stay on These Roads" (7″ version) – 4:46
2. "Soft Rains of April" (original mix) – 3:18
3. "Take on Me" – 3:50
4. "Cry Wolf" – 4:05

== Charts ==
=== Weekly charts ===
1988 weekly chart performance for "Stay on These Roads"
Chart (1988)	Peak position
Australia (ARIA)	56
Austria (Ö3 Austria Top 40)	11
Belgium (Ultratop 50 Flanders)	10
Denmark (IFPI)	1
Europe (Eurochart Hot 100 Singles)	3
Europe (European Airplay Top 50)	1
Finland (Suomen virallinen lista)	10
France (SNEP)	3
Iceland (Íslenski Listinn Topp 10)	3
Ireland (IRMA)	2
Italy (Musica e dischi)	1
Italy Airplay (Music & Media)	15
Netherlands (Dutch Top 40)	8
Netherlands (Single Top 100)	10
Norway (VG-lista)	1
Portugal (AFP)	9 (Note: The exact peak position in Portugal is unknown. The single reached at least number 9, as Music & Media provided the single's ranking only for that week, but it did not reach the top three, given every week by the magazine.)
South Africa (Springbok Radio)	4
Spain (AFYVE)	20
Sweden (Sverigetopplistan)	17
Switzerland (Schweizer Hitparade)	10
UK Singles (Official Charts)	5
West Germany (GfK)	7

2026 weekly chart performance for "Stay on These Roads"
Chart (2026)	Peak position
Norway Airplay (IFPI Norge)	87

=== Year-end charts ===
1988 year-end chart performance for "Stay on These Roads"
Chart (1988)	Position
Belgium (Ultratop 50 Flanders)	78
Europe (Eurochart Hot 100 Singles)	20
Europe (European Airplay Top 50)	11
France (IFOP)	26
Netherlands (Dutch Top 40)	77
Netherlands (Single Top 100)	64
South Africa (SA Singles Charts)	21
West Germany (Media Control)	56

1985–1989 chart performance for "Stay on These Roads"
Chart (1985–1989)	Position
Europe (European Hot 100 Singles)	73

== Certifications ==
Certifications for "Stay on These Roads"
Region	Certification	Certified units/sales
France (SNEP)	Silver	250,000^{*}
^{*} Sales figures based on certification alone.
