= The Living Daylights (song) =

- Standard European picture sleeve

Single by A-ha

from the album The Living Daylights: Original Motion Picture Soundtrack and Stay on These Roads
- Released: 22 June 1987
- Recorded: 1987
- Genre: Synth-pop
- Length: 4:14 (soundtrack version); 4:46 (album version)
- Label: Warner Bros.
- Songwriters: Pål Waaktaar; John Barry
- Producers: Jason Corsaro; Magne Furuholmen; Pål Waaktaar; John Barry

A-ha singles chronology
"Manhattan Skyline" (1987)	"The Living Daylights" (1987)	"Stay on These Roads" (1988)

James Bond theme singles chronology
"A View to a Kill" (1985)	"The Living Daylights" (1987)	"Licence to Kill" (1989)

Audio sample
- Stay on These Roads version: file; help

"The Living Daylights" is the theme song from the 1987 James Bond film of the same name, performed by Norwegian synth-pop band a-ha and included on the film's soundtrack album. It was written by guitarist Pål Waaktaar. A revised version of the song was included on the band's third studio album, Stay on These Roads (1988).

== Origin and recording ==
John Barry is credited as co-writer and producer, and the initial release of the song on the 1987 soundtrack of The Living Daylights was his version. A second version of the song, re-worked by A-ha in 1988, later appeared on their third studio album, Stay on These Roads.

When interviewed on a late-night show in 1987, Barry said that he found working with the band exhausting secondary to the band's insistence on using their own version of the song for release. In an interview with Hot Rod magazine, keyboardist Magne Furuholmen said that "[the band's] fight with Barry left a rather unpleasant aftertaste. Apparently, he compared us to Hitlerjugend in a newspaper interview."

Lead singer Morten Harket stated in an interview with Paul Lester of The Guardian in 2016 that Barry was "honestly not an easy guy to like. He was very strange in that he started to befriend us by talking bad about Duran Duran. He made some degrading comments about them and what they'd been doing and that didn't sit well with any of us". Harket stated further that; "he then made some derogatory comments about women and it was all uncalled for. There will be people who knew him who will have a very different view of him. But he didn't go down well with us."

In an interview with NME in 2022, Harket commented further that; "It was down to a clash in mentalities. His mentality was the way it was and it surfaced in various ways. None of us agreed with his worldview and the way he spoke about other human beings. We couldn't speak a common language between each other. But his input in the song was essentially just making a few changes to the verse melody: the rest was already there."

Waaktaar stated that although Barry produced the track, he never contributed to the songwriting process and should not have been credited as such. (The band Duran Duran made similar claims after they worked briefly with Barry on the theme to the previous Bond film, "A View to a Kill", in 1985.) The situation grew even more tense when Harket and company informed the producers they would not attend the London premiere. "We fell out with [Bond composer] John Barry, and also the whole Bond Broccoli people [the producers], because we didn't come to the premiere in London. We informed them that, on the date that they had set, we were booked fully in Japan for a big tour. We couldn't make it." The Bond camp assumed A-ha would change their minds. "They didn't think we were serious. And we didn't show up. They went ballistic. They pulled the song from the American version." However, Waaktaar has also said: "I loved the stuff he [John Barry] added to the track. I mean, it gave it this sort of really cool string arrangement. That's when it, for me, started to sound like a Bond thing."

== Release and reception ==
"The Living Daylights" was released in the summer of 1987. The song peaked at number five on the UK Singles Chart and number one in Norway.

The song remains one of A-ha's most played songs in live concerts and has often been extended into a "sing-along" with the audience, as featured on the 2003 live album How Can I Sleep with Your Voice in My Head. In live performances, Waaktaar often included the main "James Bond Theme" in his guitar solo.

Evan Cater of AllMusic said the song was "a strong sample of Seven and the Ragged Tiger-influenced Europop, enhanced by Morten Harket's powerhouse falsetto vocals."

South African heavy metal band The Narrow released a cover version on their album Travellers in 2005.

== Music video ==
The music video, which was directed by Steve Barron, was shot at the 007 Stage in London, which was built specifically for the James Bond franchise. It features various scenes from the film projected on to the band as they perform in the empty 007 Stage. Separate footage from the movie itself is shown, along with footage from the film traced out and inserted to the footage of the band performing, which was a groundbreaking, yet expensive innovation at that time.

== Track listings ==
7-inch single: Warner Bros. / W 8305 United Kingdom

1. "The Living Daylights" – 4:04
2. "The Living Daylights" (instrumental) – 4:36

12-inch single: Warner Bros. / W 8305T United Kingdom

1. "The Living Daylights" (extended mix) – 6:48
2. "The Living Daylights" (7-inch version) – 4:04
3. "The Living Daylights" (instrumental) – 4:36
- Track 1 is also known as the "extended version".
- Also released as a 12" picture disc (W 8305TP)

== Charts ==
=== Weekly charts ===
Weekly chart performance for "The Living Daylights"
Chart (1987)	Peak position
Australia (Australian Music Report)	29
Austria (Ö3 Austria Top 40)	18
Belgium (Ultratop 50 Flanders)	4
Canada Top Singles (RPM)	48
Denmark (IFPI)	3
Europe (European Hot 100 Singles)	3
Finland (Suomen virallinen lista)	3
France (SNEP)	21
Ireland (IRMA)	2
Italy (Musica e dischi)	3
Italy Airplay (Music & Media)	1
Netherlands (Dutch Top 40)	11
Netherlands (Single Top 100)	9
New Zealand (Recorded Music NZ)	50
Norway (VG-lista)	1
Quebec (ADISQ)	38
South Africa (Springbok Radio)	5
Spain (AFYVE)	30
Sweden (Sverigetopplistan)	3
Switzerland (Schweizer Hitparade)	8
UK Singles (Official Charts)	5
West Germany (GfK)	8

=== Year-end charts ===
Year-end chart performance for "The Living Daylights"
Chart (1987)	Position
Belgium (Ultratop 50 Flanders)	45
Denmark (IFPI)	7
Europe (European Hot 100 Singles)	19
Netherlands (Single Top 100)	92
South Africa (SA Singles Charts)	37
West Germany (Media Control)	56

== Alternative rejected theme song ==
Like other Bond themes before it, A-ha's release was not the only recorded song for the film. English synth-pop duo Pet Shop Boys also recorded a song for the film that was optioned to the studio. The duo later reworked the song they submitted into "This Must Be the Place I Waited Years to Leave", which was released on their Behaviour album in 1990.

== MTV Unplugged appearance ==
In 2017, A-ha appeared on the television series MTV Unplugged and played and recorded acoustic versions of many of their popular songs for the album MTV Unplugged – Summer Solstice in Giske, Norway, including "The Living Daylights".

== See also ==
- James Bond music
- Outline of James Bond
