= Hunting High and Low (song) =

Single by a-ha

from the album Hunting High and Low
- B-side: "The Blue Sky" (demo version); "And You Tell Me" (demo version); "Train of Thought" (Reflection mix)
- Released: 2 June 1986
- Length: 3:44 (album version); 3:48 (single remix); 6:03 (extended remix)
- Label: Warner Bros.
- Songwriter: Pål Waaktaar
- Producer: Tony Mansfield

A-ha singles chronology
"Train of Thought" (1986)	"Hunting High and Low" (1986)	"I've Been Losing You" (1986)

Music video
- "Hunting High and Low" on YouTube

"Hunting High and Low" is a song by the Norwegian synth-pop band a-ha, released in June 1986 as the fifth and final single from the band's debut studio album of the same name (1985). It became the third most successful single from Hunting High and Low on the charts and one of the band's most recognizable and popular songs. The song did not chart in the United States, but reached the top five in the United Kingdom and Ireland.

== Release ==
The original album version was produced by Tony Mansfield and is performed on synthesizers. For its single release, the track was remixed, with additional production by Alan Tarney and the London Philharmonic Orchestra. String scores for the 7-inch remix were composed by Anne Dudley.

== Music video ==
This was the last video from the band's debut album which was directed by Steve Barron.

The UK TV show Blue Peter featured a making-of special on the "Hunting High and Low" video to demonstrate the morphing effects of Morten Harket turning into predatory animals that hunt.

The video starts with a lonely Morten Harket walking across a snowy landscape which then cuts to visuals of the band, (with Harket on vocals, Magne Furuholmen on piano and Paul Waaktaar-Savoy on guitar) in a studio seen only in stark silhouette against a white background. The film then cuts back to show Harket turn into an eagle using animation and fly off across the snowscape into a city. With the orchestral part of the song starting the video goes back to the silhouettes of the band, this time with an string orchestra, animated in a rotating effect like a Victorian Zoetrope.

Harket is then seen standing on top of a cliff face which he dives off into the ocean below, morphing into a shark as he does so. He swims off across the ocean. A woman is shown on a beach who sees the shark approaching and steps into the water, as if she knows him. However, two hunters spear the shark and try to drag it onto the beach. As the creature washes up on the beach, it briefly morphs back into a human form before then turning into yet another predatory animal, a lion. It runs off into the wilderness. As the film moves toward the end, the silhouettes of Harket, Furuholmen and Waaktaar-Savoy become full colour and their faces become visible. A hunter is then seen lining up the lion in his rifle sights, about to shoot it. The woman from the beach steps in, and stops the hunter from shooting the lion.

The music video was uploaded to A-ha's official YouTube channel on 5 November 2010. As of 29 July 2025, it has gained more than 81 million views.

== Critical reception ==
Jerry Smith of the Music Week magazine was critical of "Hunting High and Low" which he considered "a mawkish ballad with its stultifying Tony Mansfield production", added it was "unlikely to appeal to anyone other than their most ardent fans" and that A-ha "reached a low" with this song". When reviewing the single, Jim Reid of Record Mirror stated: "The angst, the strain, the melodrama, the syrupy background – it can't be serious can it? Wherefore the torture that afflicts those Pepsadenl smiles? In short, leave it out". By contrast, Vici McDonald of Smash Hits praised the song as being "smooth and tunesome" and "the best track" from the album, since a-ha "[ha]ve put a bit more effort into it [than on "Train of Thought"]... adding an orchestra, and getting a trendy producer to tinker around with the mix"; however, she concluded that a-ha need "far better songs than this" if they want to become as popular as the Beatles.

== Airing ban ==
For a brief period, "Hunting High and Low" was banned from airing on BBC Radio during the 1991 Gulf War, being one of the many songs from various artists that were banned during the incident.

== MTV Unplugged appearance ==
In 2017, a-ha appeared on the television series MTV Unplugged and played and recorded acoustic versions of many of their popular songs for the album MTV Unplugged – Summer Solstice in Giske, Norway, including "Hunting High and Low".

== Track listings ==
- 7-inch: Warner Bros. / W 6663 (UK)

A. "Hunting High and Low" (remix) – 3:45
B. "The Blue Sky" (demo version) – 3:12

- 12-inch: Warner Bros. / W 6663T (UK)

A. "Hunting High and Low" (extended version) – 6:03
B1. "Hunting High and Low" (remix) – 3:45
B2. "The Blue Sky" (demo version) – 3:12

- 7-inch: Warner Bros. / 9 28684-7 (US)

A. "Hunting High and Low" (remix) – 3:45
B. "And You Tell Me" (demo version) – 1:52

- 12-inch: Warner Bros. / 9 20478-0 (US)

A. "Hunting High and Low" (extended remix) – 6:03
B1. "Train of Thought" (reflection mix) – 7:00
B2. "And You Tell Me" (demo version) – 1:52

The "extended remix", the same version as the "extended version", and the "remix" version, are all produced by Tony Mansfield, additional production by Alan Tarney. "Train of Thought" (reflection mix) is the same version as the "Steve Thompson mix" and "The U.S. mix".

== Charts ==
=== Weekly charts ===
Weekly chart performance for "Hunting High and Low"
Chart (1986)	Peak position
Australia (Kent Music Report)	33
Austria (Ö3 Austria Top 40)	24
Belgium (Ultratop 50 Flanders)	20
Brazil (NOPEM)	3
Europe (European Hot 100 Singles)	3
France (SNEP)	4
Ireland (IRMA)	4
Italy (Musica e dischi)	5
Netherlands (Dutch Top 40)	15
Netherlands (Single Top 100)	9
New Zealand (Recorded Music NZ)	25
Norway (VG-lista)	10
UK Singles (Official Charts)	5
West Germany (GfK)	11

=== Year-end charts ===
Year-end chart performance for "Hunting High and Low"
Chart (1986)	Position
Europe (European Hot 100 Singles)	13
France (SNEP)	14
Netherlands (Single Top 100)	76
West Germany (Media Control)	58

1985–1989 chart performance for "Hunting High and Low"
Chart (1985–1989)	Position
Europe (European Hot 100 Singles)	67
