= Early Morning (song) =

Single by A-ha

from the album East of the Sun, West of the Moon
- B-side: "East of the Sun"
- Released: 25 February 1991
- Length: 2:59
- Label: Warner Bros.
- Songwriters: Magne Furuholmen; Paul Waaktaar-Savoy
- Producer: Ian Stanley

A-ha singles chronology
| "I Call Your Name" (1990) | "Early Morning" (1991) | "Waiting for Her" (1991) |

Music video
- "Early Morning" on YouTube

"Early Morning" is a song by Norwegian synth-pop band A-ha, which was released in February 1991 by Warner Bros. as the third single from their fourth studio album, East of the Sun, West of the Moon (1990). It was written by Paul Waaktaar-Savoy and Magne Furuholmen, and produced by Ian Stanley. "Early Morning" reached number 78 in the United Kingdom and number 29 in Ireland. A music video was filmed to promote the single, directed by Michael Burlingame, while the video's black-and-white footage was directed by Lauren Savoy.

Recalling the song in 2015, Furuholmen revealed it references the Doors, who had been "childhood heroes" to the band.

== Critical reception ==
Upon its release as a single, Music & Media wrote, "The band continue their brand of easy recognisable pop tunes which EHR programmers will welcome with open arms." Julian Cope of NME picked "Early Morning" as one of the magazine's "single[s] of the week" and commented that it "could be from the second Doors album". Derry Journal remarked that A-ha had, despite releasing "some extremely dodgy records in the past", "this time around put a record out that is definitely worth the critical acclaim they have received" and added, "Should be a hit if there [are] still any A-ha fans about." In a retrospective review of East of the Sun, West of the Moon, Sassan Niasseri of Rolling Stone said the song "tells of murder and suicide, backed by a psychedelic-sounding bass drumming a la The Doors." Paul Sinclair of Super Deluxe Edition described it as "wistful adult pop".

== Track listings ==
- 7-inch and cassette single
1. "Early Morning" – 2:59
2. "East of the Sun" – 4:47
- CD and 12-inch single
1. "Early Morning" – 2:59
2. "East of the Sun" – 4:47
3. "Train of Thought" – 4:11

== Personnel ==
A-ha

- Morten Harket – vocals
- Paul Waaktaar-Savoy – guitars
- Magne Furuholmen – keyboards

Additional musicians

- Jørun Bøgeberg – bass guitar
- Per Hillestad – drums

Production

- Ian Stanley – producer
- Nick Davis – recording, mixing

Other

- Knut Bry – photography
- Bill Smith Studio – design

== Charts ==
Chart performance for "Early Morning"
| Chart (1991) | Peak position |
|---|---|
| Germany (GfK) | 52 |
| Ireland (IRMA) | 29 |
| UK Singles (OCC) | 78 |
| UK Airplay (Music Week) | 41 |
