= I've Been Losing You =

Single by A-ha

from the album Scoundrel Days
- B-side: "This Alone Is Love"
- Released: 22 September 1986
- Recorded: 1986
- Genre: Pop rock; synth-pop
- Length: 4:28
- Label: Warner Bros.
- Songwriter: Pål Waaktaar
- Producers: Pål Waaktaar; Magne Furuholmen

A-ha singles chronology
"Hunting High and Low" (1986)	"I've Been Losing You" (1986)	"Cry Wolf" (1986)

Music video
- "I've Been Losing You" on YouTube

"I've Been Losing You" is a song by Norwegian synth-pop band A-ha, released as the lead single from their second studio album, Scoundrel Days (1986). It reached number one in Denmark and Norway, and number eight in the United Kingdom. It achieved worldwide sales of over 1.1 million copies.

The music video was shot in a wide arena in Los Angeles.

== B-side ==
"This Alone Is Love" was the B-side, in an earlier, rawer form than the one that was re-recorded for Stay on These Roads. Both versions can be easily differentiated by their duration and the use of certain instruments. The earlier version is notable for its organ solo that sets in at 3:36 until the end of the song. The Stay on These Roads version is notable for its guitar solo. The chorus ("It will make my last breath pass out at dawn / It will make my body dissolve out in the blue") is derived from the song "May the Last Danse Be Mine" by Waaktaar and Furuholmen's previous band, Bridges.

== Track listings ==
7-inch single: Warner Bros. / W8594 (United Kingdom)

1. "I've Been Losing You" (single version) – 4:25
2. "This Alone Is Love" – 4:33

12-inch single: Warner Bros. / W8594T United Kingdom)

1. "I've Been Losing You" (extended mix) – 6:58
2. "I've Been Losing You" (dub mix) – 4:25
3. "This Alone Is Love" – 4:33
- Tracks 1 and 2 remixed by Jellybean Benitez.

7-inch single: Warner Bros. / 7-28594 (United States)

1. "I've Been Losing You" (single version) – 4:25
2. "This Alone Is Love" – 4:33

12-inch single: Warner Bros. / 9 20557-0 (United States)

1. "I've Been Losing You" (extended mix) – 6:58
2. "I've Been Losing You" (dub mix) – 4:25
3. "This Alone Is Love" – 4:33
- Tracks 1 and 2 remixed by Jellybean Benitez.

7-inch single: Warner Bros. / 92-85947 Canada

1. "I've Been Losing You" (edit) – 3:36
2. "This Alone Is Love" – 4:33

== Charts ==
=== Weekly charts ===
Weekly chart performance for "I've Been Losing You"
Chart (1986)	Peak position
Australia (Kent Music Report)	21
Austria (Ö3 Austria Top 40)	20
Belgium (Ultratop 50 Flanders)	13
Denmark (IFPI)	1
Europe (European Hot 100 Singles)	4
Finland (Suomen virallinen lista)	12
France (SNEP)	14
Ireland (IRMA)	3
Italy (Musica e dischi)	7
Netherlands (Dutch Top 40)	11
Netherlands (Single Top 100)	11
New Zealand (Recorded Music NZ)	15
Norway (VG-lista)	1
Spain (AFYVE)	10
Sweden (Sverigetopplistan)	11
Switzerland (Schweizer Hitparade)	16
UK Singles (Official Charts)	8
West Germany (GfK)	15

=== Year-end charts ===
Year-end chart performance for "I've Been Losing You"
Chart (1986)	Position
Belgium (Ultratop Flanders)	99
Europe (European Hot 100 Singles)	93
Netherlands (Single Top 100)	87
South Africa (SA Singles Charts)	100

== Certifications ==
Certifications for "I've Been Losing You"
Region	Certification	Certified units/sales
France (SNEP)	Silver	250,000^{*}
^{*} Sales figures based on certification alone.

== MTV Unplugged appearance ==
In 2017, A-ha appeared on the television series MTV Unplugged and played and recorded acoustic versions of many of their popular songs for the album MTV Unplugged – Summer Solstice in Giske, Norway, including "I've Been Losing You" (featuring Lissie).
