= You Have What It Takes =

Single by A-ha

from the album True North
- Released: 16 September 2022
- Recorded: 2021
- Genre: Soft rock; Pop
- Length: 4:22
- Songwriter: Magne Furuholmen

A-ha singles chronology
"I'm In" (2022)	"You Have What It Takes" (2022)

Music videos
- "You Have What It Takes" (Official Lyric Video) on YouTube
- "You Have What It Takes" (Official video) on YouTube

"You Have What It Takes" is the second single from A-ha's 11th studio album True North, released on September 16, 2022.

== Background ==
A demo version of the song was first released by Magne Furuholmen on his Instagram page on April 4, 2021, with himself providing the vocals. The song was subsequently played live on the band's 2022 tour before it was released.

The final track which accompanies acoustic guitars and symphonic parts is sung by Morten Harket and is very similar to the demo version.

A video for the song was released on September 29, 2022,

Furuholmen said about the track: “We live in increasingly confusing and volatile times, and there are things we often forget to express enough – to each other, to our children, our loved ones, our friends, and the generation growing up. If we want changes for the better, it starts with people who care enough to stand up for their ideals and for the rest of us to support them. I have great hope for the future when I see the courage and conviction of the young. They have it, and so do you. YOU have what it takes!”
