= Manhattan Skyline (song) =

Single by A-ha

from the album Scoundrel Days
- B-side: "We're Looking for the Whales" (Live in Croydon)
- Released: 16 February 1987
- Recorded: 1986
- Genre: Synth-pop; pop rock
- Length: 4:52
- Label: Warner Bros.
- Songwriters: Magne Furuholmen; Pål Waaktaar
- Producer: Alan Tarney

A-ha singles chronology
"Cry Wolf" (1986)	"Manhattan Skyline" (1987)	"The Living Daylights" (1987)

Music video
- "Manhattan Skyline" on YouTube

"Manhattan Skyline" is a song by Norwegian synth-pop band A-ha, released in February 1987 as the third single from their second studio album, Scoundrel Days (1986). It reached No. 13 on the UK singles chart.

== Background and recording ==
The song was co-written by keyboardist Magne Furuholmen and guitarist Pål Waaktaar. The song starts with Furuholmen playing a Harpsichord synthesizer sound in F major, before kicking into a hard rock-style chorus with a guitar riff in D minor. In the official A-ha biography, The Swing of Things 1985–2010 by Jan Omdahl, Furuholmen said: "Manhattan Skyline" was perhaps one of the most inspired cut and paste projects that Paul and I did. I wrote the quiet part. Paul wrote the rock part. I thought I was doing a classic when I worked on the opening riff. Well, okay, it is a classic, actually."

The B-side, "We're Looking for the Whales", was recorded at a concert at Fairfield Halls, Croydon in London on 19 January 1987.

The single version omits the lyric "you see things in the depths of my eyes that my love's run dry" that is present twice on the album version during the song's main chorus.

== Music video ==
On 10 January 1987, A-ha filmed the "Manhattan Skyline" video in a London studio. The music video was directed by Steve Barron and was inspired by newsprint, featuring a connect-the-dots animation of the band, a crossword puzzle, a printing press, and articles from newspapers from around the world.

The newspaper at the end is one of Norway's largest papers, Aftenposten.

== Track listings ==
7-inch: Warner Bros. / W 8405 United Kingdom (1987)

1. "Manhattan Skyline" (single edit) – 4:21
2. "We're Looking for the Whales" (edit) (live in Croydon) – 3:50
- Track 2 recorded live at Fairfield Hall, Croydon, on 19 January 1987.

12-inch: Warner Bros. / W 8405TW United Kingdom (1987)

1. "Manhattan Skyline" (extended remix) – 6:49
2. "We're Looking for the Whales" (full) (live in Croydon) – 6:44
3. "Manhattan Skyline" (album version) – 4:52
- Track 1 remixed by Mags Furuholmen, Pål Waaktar and Gerry W.W. Kitchingham.
- Track 2 recorded live at Fairfield Hall, Croydon, on 19 January 1987.

== Charts ==
Chart performance for "Manhattan Skyline"
Chart (1987)	Peak position
Belgium (Ultratop 50 Flanders)	16
Europe (European Hot 100 Singles)	13
Ireland (IRMA)	3
Netherlands (Single Top 100)	53
Norway (VG-lista)	4
UK Singles (OCC)	13
West Germany (GfK)	28

== In popular culture ==
The song is featured in Limmy's Show, the scene in which it's featured spawning the popular "Benny Harvey" joke, started by Limmy at the end of the scene.

== MTV Unplugged appearance ==
In 2017, A-ha appeared on the television series MTV Unplugged and played and recorded acoustic versions of many of their popular songs for the album MTV Unplugged – Summer Solstice in Giske, Norway, including "Manhattan Skyline".
