= Våkenatt =

Studio album by Bridges
- Released: 2018
- Recorded: 1980–1981
- Studios: Soundart Studio, Oslo
- Genres: Alternative rock; indie rock
- Label: Rockheim Musical Archives
- Producers: Svein Erichsen, Paul Waaktaar-Savoy (2018)

Bridges chronology
Fakkeltog (1980)	Våkenatt (2018)

Våkenatt is an album by Bridges. The release features a-ha band members Magne Furuholmen and Paul Waaktaar-Savoy along with Viggo Bondi and Øystein Jevanord. It was recorded in Oslo between 1980 and 1981 and released in 2018. Nine hundred numbered albums, pressed on green vinyl, were manufactured. This release includes a 16-page booklet

Paul Waaktaar-Savoy said about this release:

We got the 16-track tape and I mixed it and we’ve got tons of cool pictures, and old reviews and it actually sounds pretty good. And it’s got old songs… the early version of Scoundrel Days on it, the first version of Soft Rains Of April and a lot of other stuff that are actually very… I’d re-record them now, if I could.

— Paul Sinclair, Embryonic a-ha album by Bridges to be released for the first time later this year, Super Deluxe Edition

All tracks are written by Bridges.

Side one
No.	Title	Length
1.	"Fakkeltog"	9:25
2.	"The Leap"	2:40
3.	"Soft Rains of April"	3:40
4.	"Waterworks"	4:15

Side two
No.	Title	Length
5.	"All The Planes That Come In On The Quiet"	4:35
6.	"Asleep"	3:05
7.	"Superior"	2:50
8.	"Faceless City"	2:30
9.	"Need No Doctor"	2:10
10.	"Wildfire"	4:00
