= Past Perfect Future Tense =

Studio album by Magne Furuholmen
- Released: 2004
- Recorded: 2004
- Genre: Alternative rock; indie rock
- Length: 46:03
- Label: Passionfruit
- Producer: Martin Terefe; Magne Furuholmen

Magne Furuholmen chronology
Hermetic (1998)	Past Perfect Future Tense (2004)	A Dot of Black in the Blue of Your Bliss (2008)

Singles from Past Perfect Future Tense
- 1. "Past Perfect Future Tense" Released: September 2004; 2. "Kryptonite" Released: 14 March 2005; 3. "2CU Shine" Released: 9 May 2005; 4. "All The Time (UK Promo)" Released: 2005; 5. "Nothing Here to Hold You (Italy Promo)" Released: 2005

Past Perfect Future Tense is the first solo album by Norwegian band a-ha's Magne Furuholmen as Magne F. Coldplay members, Will Champion and Guy Berryman collaborated on this project as well as Travis member, Andy Dunlop.

The album was recorded at Kensaltown Recording Studios in London. To launch the record Magne Furuholmen set up a website featuring hidden links to be found among the album lyrics. The album was launched in conjunction with "Payne’s Gray", a portfolio consisting of 12 prints featuring extracts of the album lyrics, followed by a coffee table art book ("Payne's Gray", 2004, Hatje Cantz Publishers, ISBN 978-3775715676).

Furuholmen told Norwegian newspaper VG: "It all started out as an ordinary songwriting process in the wake of the last a-ha album, but all the way I’ve had this feeling that it was turning into a solo project."

== Track listing ==
All tracks are written by Magne Furuholmen.

No.	Title	Length
1.	"Obsolete"	3:47
2.	"All the Time"	4:22
3.	"Past Perfect Future Tense"	3:27
4.	"No One Gets Me But You"	5:03
5.	"Kryptonite"	4:25
6.	"Nothing Here to Hold You"	5:13
7.	"A Friend Like Me"	2:36
8.	"Little Angels"	2:52
9.	"2CU Shine"	3:00
10.	"You Don't Have to Change"	3:18
11.	"Envelop Me"	3:30
12.	"Never Sweeter plus Perfect Circle"	09:33
Total length:		46:03

The song "Never Sweeter" ends at minute 2:56. After 5 minutes of silence (2:56 – 7:56), begins the hidden track "Perfect Circle".
