= I Call Your Name (A-ha song) =

Single by A-ha

from the album East of the Sun, West of the Moon
- B-side: "The Way We Talk"; "The Blood That Moves The Body"
- Released: 3 December 1990
- Recorded: 1990
- Genre: Pop rock
- Length: 4:54
- Label: Warner Bros.
- Songwriters: Pål Waaktaar; Magne Furuholmen
- Producers: Chris Neil; Ian Stanley; Alan Tarney

A-ha singles chronology
"Crying in the Rain" (1990)	"I Call Your Name" (1990)	"Early Morning" (1991)

Music video
- "I Call Your Name" on YouTube

"I Call Your Name" is a song by Norwegian synth-pop band A-ha, released on 3 December 1990 by Warner Bros. as the second single from their fourth studio album, East of the Sun, West of the Moon (1990). It was written by Paul Waaktaar-Savoy and Magne Furuholmen. This song has saxophone from Phil Todd.

== Music video ==
The accompanying music video for "I Call Your Name" was directed by Michael Burlingame and Lauren Savoy. It received heavy rotation on MTV Europe in January 1991. Two versions of the video were produced, one in gray-scale and one in color.

== Critical reception ==
Davydd Chong of Record Mirror described the song as "comfortable, inoffensive pop".

== Track listings ==
- 7-inch single: Warner Bros. / W 9462 United Kingdom
1. "I Call Your Name" – 4:54
2. "The Way We Talk" – 1:30
- 12-inch single: Warner Bros. / W 9462T United Kingdom
1. "I Call Your Name" – 4:54
2. "The Way We Talk" – 1:30
3. "The Blood That Moves The Body" – 4:05
- 7-inch single: Warner Bros. / W 9462EP United Kingdom
1. "I Call Your Name" – 4:54
2. "The Sun Always Shines on T.V." – 5:08
3. "Hunting High And Low" – 3:44
4. "The Blood That Moves The Body" – 4:05

Note: This 7-inch vinyl release is a "Limited Edition E.P."

- CD single: Warner Bros. / W 9462CD United Kingdom
1. "I Call Your Name" – 4:54
2. "The Way We Talk" – 1:30
3. The Blood That Moves The Body" – 4:05

== Charts ==
Chart performance for "I Call Your Name"
Chart (1990–1991)	Peak position
Australia (ARIA)	155
Europe (European Airplay Top 50)	29
Europe (European Hit Radio)	9
France (SNEP)	45
Germany (GfK)	37
Iceland (Íslenski Listinn Topp 10)	4
Netherlands (Single Top 100)	38
Netherlands (Tipparade)	3
UK Singles (Official Charts)	44
