= I Call Your Name (disambiguation) =

"I Call Your Name" is a song by The Beatles.

I Call Your Name may also refer to:

- "I Call Your Name" (Roxette song)
- "I Call Your Name" (A-ha song)
- "I Call Your Name", a song by Johnny Clegg and Savuka from Shadow Man
- "I Call Your Name", a song by Switch from Switch II

== See also ==
- Bleach: Fade to Black, I Call Your Name, a 2008 anime film
