= Cosy Prisons =

Single by A-ha

from the album Analogue
- Released: 6 April 2006
- Recorded: 2006
- Genre: Alternative rock
- Length: 4:08
- Label: Polydor
- Songwriter: Magne Furuholmen
- Producers: Martin Terefe; Magne Furuholmen; George Tandero

A-ha singles chronology
"Analogue (All I Want)" (2006)	"Cosy Prisons" (2006)	"Foot of the Mountain" (2009)

"Cosy Prisons" is a song by Norwegian band A-ha, released in the UK as the third single from their album Analogue on 6 April 2006.

The UK single features a new mix of the song which was worked on by Magne Furuholmen and Dave Bascombe. It peaked at number 39 on the UK Singles Chart.

== Music video ==
The "Cosy Prisons" video shoot took place on 4 March 2006 in London. It was filmed at the Abbey Mills Pumping Station, Abbey Lane, London, E15, a former sewage pumping station built in the 1860s. The video was directed by Paul Gore.

== Track listing ==
=== UK ===
1. "Cosy Prisons" (Radio Mix)
2. "The Sun Always Shines on T.V." (BBC Radio 2 Ken Bruce Session)

=== UK 7" picture disc ===
1. "Cosy Prisons" (Radio Mix)
2. "Stay on These Roads" (BBC Radio 2 Ken Bruce session)

=== Germany ===
The single was due to be released in Germany on 21 April, but the release was cancelled. However, the single was pressed and copies do exist. The cover is very similar to the UK release, but the logo on Morten's T-shirt is missing.

Germany CD track listing:

1. 'Radio Version' of "Cosy Prisons"
2. The live version of "Cosy Prisons" from the Ken Bruce session
3. The "Original Cosy Prisons Demo"
4. "Birthright" live on Radio Clyde
5. Also includes a desktop player with "Cosy Prisons" video and picture gallery.
