= A Dot of Black in the Blue of Your Bliss =

Studio album by Magne F
- Released: 19 May 2008
- Recorded: 2007
- Genre: Alternative rock, indie rock
- Length: 36:11
- Label: Genepool (UK); Passionfruit
- Producer: Magne Furuholmen; Jonny Sjo; Karl Wennerberg; Dan Sundhordvik; Guy Berryman; George Tanderø; Jon Marius Aareskjold

Magne F chronology
Past Perfect Future Tense (2004)	A Dot of Black in the Blue of Your Bliss (2008)	White Xmas Lies (2019)

A Dot of Black in the Blue of Your Bliss is the second solo album by Norwegian band a-ha's Magne Furuholmen as Magne F. It was released as a 300 copy limited six-track vinyl EP in February 2008 and then as a regular CD in May 2008. The limited vinyl copies included a special hand painted cover by Magne Furuholmen himself as well as the CD and a poster featuring all the hand painted covers that were part of one bigger artwork. Furuholmen painted the record covers at Oslo's City Hall in January 2008. The performance was streamed on his website.

The album sees the collaboration of Guy Berryman from Coldplay as a bass player.

In 2009, the track "The Longest Night" was used by a-ha as a base for the song "Foot of the Mountain", which is available on the album of the same name.

== Track listing ==
=== Official release ===
All tracks are written by Magne Furuholmen.

No.	Title	Length
1.	"Intro"	0:21
2.	"A Dot of Black in the Blue of Your Bliss"	3:54
3.	"Come Back"	3:41
4.	"The Longest Night"	3:30
5.	"Time & Place"	3:57
6.	"Running Out of Reasons"
7.	"Forgotten Not Forgiven"	3:26
8.	"More Than Good Enough"	3:28
9.	"Too Far, Too Fast"	4:25
10.	"Watch This Space"	3:15
11.	"Hidden Track"	2:58
Total length:		36:11

=== Limited release ===
All tracks are written by Magne Furuholmen.

No.	Title	Length
1.	"A Dot of Black in the Blue of Your Bliss"	3:54
2.	"The Longest Night"	3:30
3.	"Time & Place"	3:57
4.	"Come Back"	3:41
5.	"Running Out of Reasons"	3:26
6.	"More Than Good Enough"	3:31
Total length:		21:59
