= Analogue (album) =

Studio album by A-ha
- Released: 4 November 2005
- Recorded: February – July 2005
- Studios: The Alabaster Box, New York City, US; Ocean Way, Nashville, US; Rainbow, Oslo, Norway; My Home Studio, Oslo, Norway; Kensal Town Studios, West London, UK; Assault & Battery, London; Townhouse, London; Maratone, Stockholm, Sweden; Mono Music, Stockholm, Sweden
- Length: 54:43
- Label: Polydor
- Producers: Martin Terefe; A-ha; Max Martin; Michael Ilbert; George Tanderø; Kjetil Bjerkestrand

A-ha chronology
Lifelines (2002)	Analogue (2005)	Foot of the Mountain (2009)

Singles from Analogue
- 1. "Celice" Released: 7 October 2005; 2. "Birthright" Released: 28 October 2005; 3. "Analogue (All I Want)" Released: 23 January 2006; 4. "Cosy Prisons" Released: 17 April 2006

Professional ratings
Review scores
Source	Rating
AllMusic	link
The Encyclopedia of Popular Music	3/5 stars
Entertainment.ie	Archived April 6, 2010, at the Wayback Machine
TheMusicZine	Archived September 29, 2007, at the Wayback Machine

Analogue is the eighth studio album by the Norwegian synth-pop band A-ha, released in 2005. It is a-ha's first album on Polydor Records (Universal), having previously been signed to Warner Music. Four singles were also released from this record. The album's second single, "Analogue (All I Want)" became the group's first top 10 hit on the UK Singles Chart since "Stay on These Roads" (1988). The album reached No. 24 in the UK and got silver certification there.

== Background and recording ==
The song "Analogue (All I Want)" was originally a song called "Minor Key Sonata (Analogue)", which (like the rest of the album) was produced by Martin Terefe and mixed by Flood. Max Martin was then brought in to turn "Minor Key Sonata (Analogue)" into a more radio-friendly song, with a less surreal lyric and catchier chorus. The song was then re-written as "Analogue (All I Want)" and re-recorded, and is the only track on the album not produced by Terefe. Upon its release as a single, it became the band's first top 10 hit in the UK since 1988. In 2026 it became the last a-ha album to be released on vinyl.

The non-album B-side to "Analogue (All I Want)", "Case Closed on Silver Shore", was also produced during the Analogue sessions by Terefe, and mixed by Flood. It was written by Paul Waaktaar-Savoy.

The lead vocal on "The Summers of Our Youth" is by Furuholmen (the second time on an A-ha release), with Harket joining him on the chorus.

On the live version of "Holyground", Waaktaar-Savoy plays an omnichord.

== Track listing ==
No.	Title	Lyrics	Music	Producer(s)	Length
1.	"Celice"	Magne Furuholmen	Furuholmen, Martin Terefe	Terefe, A-ha	3:41
2.	"Don't Do Me Any Favours"	Furuholmen	Furuholmen	Terefe, A-ha	3:51
3.	"Cosy Prisons"	Furuholmen	Furuholmen	Terefe, A-ha, George Tanderø^{[a]}	4:08
4.	"Analogue (All I Want)"	Paul Waaktaar-Savoy, Max Martin	Waaktaar-Savoy, Martin, Furuholmen	Martin, Michael Ilbert, A-ha	3:48
5.	"Birthright"	Furuholmen	Furuholmen, Terefe	Terefe, A-ha	3:45
6.	"Holy Ground"	Morten Harket, Nick Whitecross, Ole Sverre Olsen	Harket	Terefe, A-ha, Kjetil Bjerkestrand^{[a]}	4:00
7.	"Over the Treetops"	Waaktaar-Savoy	Waaktaar-Savoy	Terefe, A-ha	4:24
8.	"Halfway Through the Tour"	Waaktaar-Savoy	Waaktaar-Savoy	Terefe, A-ha	7:26
9.	"A Fine Blue Line"	Furuholmen	Furuholmen	Terefe, A-ha	4:09
10.	"Keeper of the Flame"	Waaktaar-Savoy	Waaktaar-Savoy	Terefe, A-ha	3:58
11.	"Make It Soon"	Olsen, Harket	Olsen, Harket	Terefe, A-ha	3:21
12.	"White Dwarf"	Waaktaar-Savoy	Waaktaar-Savoy	Terefe, A-ha	4:24
13.	"The Summers of Our Youth"	Furuholmen	Furuholmen	Terefe, A-ha, Tanderø^{[a]}	3:56

iTunes Store bonus tracks
No.	Title	Lyrics	Music	Producer(s)	Length
14.	"Celice" (Thomas Schumacher remix edit)	Furuholmen	Furuholmen, Terefe	Terefe, A-ha, Thomas Schumacher^{[b]}, Stephan Bodzin^{[b]}	3:22
15.	"Celice" (Boris Dlugosch remix edit)	Furuholmen	Furuholmen, Terefe	Terefe, A-ha, Boris Dlugosch^{[b]}, Michi Lange^{[b]}	3:51

- ^{^[a]} signifies an additional producer
- ^{^[b]} signifies a remixer

== Personnel ==
A-ha

- Morten Harket – vocals
- Paul Waaktaar-Savoy – keyboards, guitars, vocals
- Magne Furuholmen – keyboards, acoustic piano, guitars, vocals

Additional musicians

- Claes Björklund – acoustic piano, programming, guitars
- Christer Karlsson – acoustic piano
- Michael Ilbert – programming
- Andreas Olsson – programming, guitars
- Martin Terefe – acoustic piano, guitars, bass
- George Tanderø – programming
- Geir Sundstøl – guitars
- Sven Lindvall – bass
- Jørun Bøgeberg – bass
- Per Lindvall – drums
- Alex Toff – drums
- Frode Unneland – drums
- Anthony LaMarchina – cello
- Kristin Wilkinson – viola
- David Angell – violin
- David Davidson – violin, string arrangements
- Graham Nash – backing vocals (3, 7)

Technical and Design

- Claes Björklund – recording
- Michael Ilbert – recording, mixing (4)
- Andreas Olsson – recording
- George Tanderø – recording
- Martin Terefe – recording
- Nathaniel Chan – additional recording
- Kelly Pribble – additional recording
- Eivind Skovdahl – additional recording
- Bobby Shin – string recording
- Flood – mixing (1, 2, 3, 5–13)
- Max Dingle – mix assistant (1, 2, 3, 5–13)
- Catherine Marks – mix assistant (1, 2, 3, 5–13)
- Andy Savours – mix assistant (1, 2, 3, 5–13)
- George Marino – mastering at Sterling Sound (New York City, New York, USA)
- Martin Kvamme – design
- Stian Andersen – photography

== Charts ==
Chart performance for Analogue
Chart (2005–2006)	Peak position
Austrian Albums (Ö3 Austria)	18
Belgian Albums (Ultratop Flanders)	98
Belgian Albums (Ultratop Wallonia)	63
Dutch Albums (Album Top 100)	50
European Albums (Billboard)	16
French Albums (SNEP)	60
German Albums (Offizielle Top 100)	6
Greek International Albums (IFPI)	23
Norwegian Albums (VG-lista)	1
Polish Albums (ZPAV)	27
Scottish Albums (Official Charts)	20
Swiss Albums (Schweizer Hitparade)	21
UK Albums (Official Charts)	24

2026 chart performance for Analogue
Chart (2026)	Peak position
Hungarian Albums (MAHASZ)	36

== Certifications ==
Certifications for Analogue
Region	Certification	Certified units/sales
United Kingdom (BPI)	Silver	60,000^{^}
^{^} Shipments figures based on certification alone.
