= True North (A-ha album) =

Studio album by A-ha
- Released: 21 October 2022
- Recorded: November 2021
- Studios: Bodø, Norway
- Length: 51:26
- Labels: RCA; Sony Music
- Producers: Magne Furuholmen, Paul Waaktaar-Savoy

A-ha chronology
MTV Unplugged: Summer Solstice (2017)	True North (2022)

Singles from True North
- 1. "I'm In" Released: 8 July 2022; 2. "You Have What It Takes" Released: 16 September 2022

True North is the eleventh studio album by Norwegian synth-pop band A-ha. It was released on 21 October 2022 by RCA and Sony Music. The album's opening track "I'm In" was released as the first single on 8 July 2022.

True North is accompanied by a film with the same title featuring a-ha recording the album during November 2021 in Bodø, Norway. Paul Waaktaar-Savoy has said of the project: "First, we had the idea to record a studio session live. Then, to film a studio session. That grew into more of a production with the Norwegian orchestra, the Arctic Philharmonic, who we have collaborated with."

The album artwork shows an image from a legendary remote surfing bay in Lofoten, an island group close to and accessed by ferry from Bodø, where the album was recorded. The location of the bay is called Unstad, where surfers and tourists visit year round for the surf and observing the northern lights in a picturesque landscape typical of Norway.

== Background and recording ==
A documentary titled a-ha: The Movie was released in 2021 and tells the story of the band and deals with both their success and the problems, such as personal rifts between members.

In January 2022, it was announced that a-ha had signed a recording contract with Sony Music imprint RCA Records in Germany to release the True North album. The concept of recording an album and an accompanying film was inspired by Bruce Springsteen's Western Stars (2019). Furuholmen wanted to create a Norwegian version of Western Stars and has called the project a "musical letter from our home country" and described the album's themes as "nature and the environment".

== Commercial performance ==
The album debuted at number 12 on the UK Albums Chart, selling 5,109 copies in its first week. It is a-ha's 17th top 75 album on the chart.

== Reception ==
Professional ratings
Review scores
Source	Rating
AllMusic	3.5/5 stars
Hymn	7/10 stars
laut.de	5/5 stars
musicOMH	3.5/5 stars
Retropop	5/5 stars
Rolling Stone Germany	4/5 stars
Under the Radar	5.5/10 stars
The Times	4/5 stars
Albumism	4.5/5 stars
maxazine.nl	9/10 stars

The album has had a positive reception from numerous publications, including Rolling Stone, musicOMH, The Times, laut.de, Hymn and Retropop.

== Track listing ==
True North track listing
No.	Title	Writer(s)	Length
1.	"I'm In"	Magne Furuholmen	5:05
2.	"Hunter in the Hills"	Paul Waaktaar-Savoy	4:11
3.	"As If"	Waaktaar-Savoy	4:56
4.	"Between the Halo and the Horn"	Furuholmen	4:11
5.	"True North"	Furuholmen	4:55
6.	"Bumblebee"	Waaktaar-Savoy	4:07
7.	"Forest for the Trees"	Waaktaar-Savoy	3:53
8.	"Bluest of Blue"	Furuholmen	4:34
9.	"Make Me Understand"	Waaktaar-Savoy	3:59
10.	"You Have What It Takes"	Furuholmen	4:22
11.	"Summer Rain"	Furuholmen	4:15
12.	"Oh My Word"	Waaktaar-Savoy	3:58
Total length:			51:26

Japanese edition bonus track
No.	Title	Length
13.	"I'm In" (Instrumental)	5:06

== Personnel ==
=== a-ha ===
- Morten Harket – lead vocals (1–12)
- Magne Furuholmen – keyboards (1, 4, 5, 8, 11), piano (1–6, 11), synth (9), acoustic guitar (1, 4, 7, 8, 10–12), backing vocals (1, 4, 5, 8, 10, 11), programming (1, 4, 5, 8, 10–11)
- Pål Waaktaar-Savoy – guitars (2, 3, 6, 7, 9, 12), backing vocals (2, 3, 6, 7, 9, 12), acoustic guitars (1, 4, 10, 11), electric guitar (5, 8), keyboards (2, 3, 6, 7, 9, 12)

=== Additional musicians ===
- Kjetil Bjerkestrand – keyboards (tracks 1–12)
- Even Ormestad – bass (tracks 1–12)
- Karl Oluf Wennerberg – drums (tracks 1, 3–5, 7, 8, 11), percussion (tracks 2, 6, 7, 9, 10, 12)
- Per Hillestad – drums (tracks 1, 2, 6, 7, 9, 12), percussion (tracks 3, 4, 8)
- Piero Perrelli – percussion (track 2)
- Thom Hell – backing vocals (tracks 4, 5, 7, 8, 10, 11)
- Erik Ljunggren – programming (track 5)
- Morten Qvenild – piano (tracks 6 and 12)
- Madeleine Ossum – violin (track 8)
- Kjetil Bjerkestrand – orchestral arrangements (tracks 1, 4, 5, 8, 10, 11)
- Joe Mardin – orchestral arrangements (tracks 2, 3, 6, 7, 9, 12)
- Brynjar Lien Schulerud – concertmaster: Norwegian Arctic Philharmonic Orchestra
- Anders Eljas – conductor Svømmehallen
- Lars Erik Gudim – conductor Store Studio

== Charts ==
=== Weekly charts ===
Weekly chart performance for True North
Chart (2022)	Peak position
Austrian Albums (Ö3 Austria)	8
Belgian Albums (Ultratop Flanders)	15
Belgian Albums (Ultratop Wallonia)	8
Dutch Albums (Album Top 100)	11
French Albums (SNEP)	38
German Albums (Offizielle Top 100)	4
Irish Albums (Official Charts)	38
Italian Albums (FIMI)	72
Japanese Albums (Oricon)	39
Japanese Hot Albums (Billboard Japan)	51
Norwegian Albums (VG-lista)	3
Polish Albums (ZPAV)	14
Portuguese Albums (AFP)	35
Scottish Albums (Official Charts)	8
Spanish Albums (Promusicae)	46
Swiss Albums (Schweizer Hitparade)	5
UK Albums (Official Charts)	12

=== Year-end charts ===
Year-end chart performance for True North
Chart (2022)	Position
German Albums (Offizielle Top 100)	86
