= Cry Wolf (A-ha song) =

Single by A-ha

from the album Scoundrel Days
- B-side: "Maybe, Maybe"
- Released: 24 November 1986
- Recorded: 1986
- Genre: Pop rock; synth-pop
- Length: 4:05
- Label: Warner Bros.
- Songwriters: Pål Waaktaar; Magne Furuholmen
- Producer: Alan Tarney

A-ha singles chronology
| "I've Been Losing You" (1986) | "Cry Wolf" (1986) | "Manhattan Skyline" (1987) |

"Cry Wolf" is a song by Norwegian synth-pop band A-ha, released as the second single from their second studio album, Scoundrel Days (1986). Cashbox called the song a "sprightly dance tune with a commercial sheen".

== Background ==
The lyrics "Night I left the city I dreamt of a Wolf..." are credited to Lauren Savoy, who was later married to the band's guitarist Pål Waaktaar.

== Commercial performance ==
"Cry Wolf" was the most successful single from the Scoundrel Days album in the United States, where it peaked at number 14 on the Hot Dance Music/Club Play charts and number 50 on the Billboard Hot 100, though it would be the band's last entry on that chart. The single reached the top 40 in various other countries, including top-five placings in the United Kingdom and Ireland, as well as number two (its highest chart position) in Norway. The single was certified silver by the British Phonographic Industry (BPI) on 1 January 1987.

== Music video ==
The video was directed by Steve Barron at the Chateau de Couches in Couches, Burgundy, France. The theme of the video was taken from the fable The Boy Who Cried Wolf which was also the inspiration for the song.

== Track listings ==
- UK 7-inch single (Warner Bros. / W 8500)
1. "Cry Wolf" (album version) – 4:05
2. "Maybe, Maybe" – 2:34
- UK 12-inch single (Warner Bros. / W 8500T)
1. "Cry Wolf" (extended version) – 8:12
2. "Cry Wolf" (album version) – 4:05
3. "Maybe, Maybe" – 2:34

== Charts ==
=== Weekly charts ===
Weekly chart performance for "Cry Wolf"
| Chart (1986–1987) | Peak position |
|---|---|
| Australia (Kent Music Report) | 45 |
| Belgium (Ultratop 50 Flanders) | 15 |
| Europe (European Hot 100 Singles) | 10 |
| France (SNEP) | 35 |
| Ireland (IRMA) | 4 |
| Italy (Musica e dischi) | 13 |
| Italy Airplay (Music & Media) | 6 |
| Netherlands (Dutch Top 40) | 16 |
| Netherlands (Single Top 100) | 12 |
| New Zealand (Recorded Music NZ) | 10 |
| Norway (VG-lista) | 2 |
| Quebec (ADISQ) | 38 |
| South Africa (Springbok Radio) | 13 |
| Switzerland (Schweizer Hitparade) | 27 |
| UK Singles (Official Charts) | 5 |
| US Billboard Hot 100 | 50 |
| US Dance Club Songs (Billboard) | 14 |
| US Dance Singles Sales (Billboard) | 30 |
| US Cash Box Top 100 Singles | 51 |
| West Germany (GfK) | 20 |

=== Year-end charts ===
Year-end chart performance for "Cry Wolf"
| Chart (1987) | Position |
|---|---|
| Europe (European Hot 100 Singles) | 93 |
| South Africa (SA Singles Charts) | 58 |

== Certifications ==
Certifications for "Cry Wolf"
| Region | Certification | Certified units/sales |
|---|---|---|
| United Kingdom (BPI) | Silver | 250,000^{^} |
^{^} Shipments figures based on certification alone.
