= Analogue (All I Want) =

2005 single by a-ha

- UK CD 1

Single by A-ha

from the album Analogue
- B-side: "Case Closed on Silver Shore"
- Released: 30 December 2005
- Length: 3:48
- Label: Polydor
- Songwriters: Paul Waaktaar-Savoy, Magne Furuholmen, Max Martin
- Producers: Max Martin, Michael Ilbert, Paul Waaktaar-Savoy

A-ha singles chronology
| "Birthright" (2005) | "Analogue (All I Want)" (2005) | "Cosy Prisons" (2006) |

Music video
- "Analogue" on YouTube

"Analogue (All I Want)" is a song by Norwegian synth-pop band A-ha. It is the title track of their eighth studio album (2005). The song was released as a single on 30 December 2005 and became a top-10 hit in Norway and the United Kingdom, their first in the latter country since 1988's "Stay on These Roads".

== Background and release ==
The song was re-written and re-recorded after it was first recorded. The original version of the song was titled "Minor Key Sonata (Analogue)", and (like the rest of the Analogue album) was produced by Martin Terefe and mixed by Flood. Max Martin was then brought in to turn "Minor Key Sonata (Analogue)" into a more radio-appropriate song, with less surreal lyrics and catchier chorus. The song was then retitled "Analogue (All I Want)" and is the only track on the album not produced by Terefe. Upon its release as a single, it became the band's first Top 10 hit in the UK since 1988.

== Music video ==
The video, which was shot in black and white, was directed by Howard Greenhalgh.

== Track listings ==
UK CD1

1. "Analogue (All I Want)" (Album Version)
2. "Case Closed on Silver Shore"

UK CD2

1. "Analogue (All I Want)" (Album Version)
2. "Minor Key Sonata (Analogue)"
3. "Keeper of the Flame" (Live at Frognerparken)
4. "Analogue (All I Want)" (Video)

German CD

1. "Analogue (All I Want)" (Album Version) 3:48
2. "Minor Key Sonata (Analogue)" 4:34
3. "Analogue (All I Want)" (Live at Frognerparken) 5:02
4. "Analogue (All I Want)" (Instrumental Version) 3:48
5. "Case Closed on Silver Shore" 4:28
6. "Analogue (All I Want)" (Video)

French CD

1. "Analogue (All I Want)" (Album Version)
2. "Case Closed on Silver Shore"

== Charts ==
| Chart (2006) | Peak position |
|---|---|
| Belgium (Ultratip Bubbling Under Wallonia) | 16 |
| Germany (GfK) | 33 |
| Ireland (IRMA) | 24 |
| Norway (VG-lista) | 10 |
| Scotland Singles (OCC) | 8 |
| UK Singles (OCC) | 10 |

== Release history ==
| Region | Date | Format(s) | Label(s) | Ref. |
|---|---|---|---|---|
| Europe | 30 December 2005 | CD | Polydor | |
| United Kingdom | 23 January 2006 | CD | Polydor | |

== MTV Unplugged appearance ==
In 2017, A-ha appeared on the television series MTV Unplugged and played and recorded acoustic versions of many of their popular songs for the album MTV Unplugged – Summer Solstice in Giske, Norway, including "Analogue (All I Want)".
