= East of the Sun, West of the Moon =

Studio album by A-ha
- Released: 22 October 1990
- Recorded: 1989–1990
- Genre: Pop rock
- Length: 45:48
- Label: Warner Bros.
- Producers: Christopher Neil; Ian Stanley

A-ha chronology
Stay on These Roads (1988)	East of the Sun, West of the Moon (1990)	Memorial Beach (1993)

Singles from East of the Sun, West of the Moon
- 1. "Crying in the Rain" Released: 1 October 1990; 2. "I Call Your Name" Released: 3 December 1990; 3. "Early Morning" Released: 25 February 1991

Professional ratings
Review scores
Source	Rating
AllMusic	3/5 stars
The Encyclopedia of Popular Music	3/5 stars
Entertainment Weekly	D+
Melody Maker	(favorable)
MusicHound Rock: The Essential Album Guide	2/5 stars
The Rolling Stone Album Guide	2/5 stars
Smash Hits	8/10 stars

East of the Sun, West of the Moon is the fourth studio album by Norwegian synth-pop band A-ha, released on 22 October 1990 by Warner Bros. Records. Named after a Norwegian fairy tale, the album was something of a departure from the band's earlier radio-friendly sound to a darker, moodier tone. It peaked at number one in the band's native Norway and reached top 20 in various European countries and Japan. It was co-produced by Ian Stanley, formerly of the band Tears for Fears.

== Critical reception ==
Entertainment Weekly wrote that "symphonic piano grandeur and alternating blues/metal/flamenco/funk additives collapse beneath the bloated synthesizer slush."

AllMusic wrote: "This is a nicely crafted collection of songs, performed and sung beautifully, with lots of echoes and suggestions tucked into the music. While not an album one can discuss at length, it's an album that's a pleasure to listen to and one that deserves a better reception than the one, unfortunately, that it seems to have gotten."

== Track listing ==
Side one
No.	Title	Writer(s)	Producer	Length
1.	"Crying in the Rain"	Howard Greenfield, Carole King	Chris Neil	4:25
2.	"Early Morning"	Pål Waaktaar, Magne Furuholmen	Ian Stanley	2:59
3.	"I Call Your Name"	Waaktaar, Furuholmen	Neil	4:54
4.	"Slender Frame"	Waaktaar, Furuholmen	Neil	3:42
5.	"East of the Sun"	Waaktaar	Stanley	4:47

Side two
No.	Title	Writer(s)	Producer	Length
6.	"Sycamore Leaves"	Waaktaar	Neil	5:22
7.	"Waiting for Her"	Waaktaar, Furuholmen	Stanley	4:49
8.	"Cold River"	Waaktaar, Lauren Savoy	Neil	4:40
9.	"The Way We Talk"	Furuholmen	Stanley	1:30
10.	"Rolling Thunder"	Waaktaar, Furuholmen	Neil	5:43
11.	"(Seemingly) Nonstop July"	Waaktaar	Stanley	2:55

- "The Way We Talk" features Magne Furuholmen on lead vocals.

=== 2015 deluxe edition ===
Disc two
No.	Title	Length
1.	"Early Morning" (early version)
2.	"East of the Sun" (early version)
3.	"I Call Your Name" (instrumental demo)
4.	"Slender Frame" (demo)
5.	"Waiting for Her" (demo)
6.	"Cold River" (demo)
7.	"Trees Will Not Grow on the Sand" (demo)
8.	"Rolling Thunder" (demo)
9.	"I Call Your Name" (NRK live)
10.	"Manhattan Skyline" (NRK live)
11.	"Early Morning" (NRK live)
12.	"Slender Frame" (NRK live)
13.	"Rolling Thunder" (NRK live)
14.	"Sycamore Leaves" (NRK live)
15.	"Crying in the Rain" (NRK live)
16.	"East of the Sun" (NRK live)
17.	"(Seemingly) Nonstop July" (NRK live)
18.	"I've Been Losing You" (NRK live)

DVD: Live in South America
No.	Title	Length
1.	"The Sun Always Shines on T.V."
2.	"Cry Wolf"
3.	"I Call Your Name"
4.	"Slender Frame"
5.	"Touchy!"
6.	"Scoundrel Days"
7.	"Rolling Thunder"
8.	"I've Been Losing You"
9.	"Early Morning"
10.	"Take On Me"
11.	"Credits"

== Personnel ==
A-ha

- Morten Harket – lead vocals, backing vocals
- Magne Furuholmen – keyboards, backing vocals, string arrangements (5), second vocals (8, 10), lead vocals (9), harmonica (10)
- Paul Waaktaar-Savoy – guitars, backing vocals, second vocals (4), bass guitar (6, 7, 8), acoustic piano (11)

Additional musicians

- Jørun Bøgeberg – bass guitar (1–5, 9, 10, 11)
- Per Hillestad – drums (1–6, 8–11)
- Chris Hughes – drums (7)
- Martin Ditcham – tambourine (3, 4), percussion (10)
- Phil Todd – saxophone (3)
- David Bedford – string arrangements (7)

Production

- Christopher Neil – producer (1, 3, 4, 6, 8, 10)
- Ian Stanley – producer (2, 5, 7, 9, 11)
- Nick Davis – recording, mixing
- Haydn Bendall – additional engineer (5, 7)
- Steve "Barney" Chase – additional engineer (5, 7)
- Kim Champagne – art direction
- Jeri Heiden – art direction
- REY International – design
- Just Loomis – cover photography
- Lauren Savoy – inner sleeve photography

== Charts ==
=== Weekly charts ===
1990–1991 weekly chart performance for East of the Sun, West of the Moon
Chart (1990–1991)	Peak position
Australian Albums (ARIA)	122
Austrian Albums (Ö3 Austria)	23
Canada Top Albums/CDs (RPM)	37
Dutch Albums (Album Top 100)	20
European Albums (Music & Media)	13
French Albums (IFOP)	15
German Albums (Offizielle Top 100)	6
Icelandic Albums (Tónlist)	5
Japanese Albums (Oricon)	20
Norwegian Albums (VG-lista)	1
Swedish Albums (Sverigetopplistan)	35
Swiss Albums (Schweizer Hitparade)	16
UK Albums (Official Charts)	12

2020 weekly chart performance for East of the Sun, West of the Moon
Chart (2020)	Peak position
Hungarian Albums (MAHASZ)	15

=== Year-end charts ===
Year-end chart performance for East of the Sun, West of the Moon
Chart (1991)	Position
European Albums (Music & Media)	99
French Albums (IFOP)	74
German Albums (Offizielle Top 100)	57

== Certifications and sales ==
Certifications and sales for East of the Sun, West of the Moon
Region	Certification	Certified units/sales
Brazil (Pro-Música Brasil)	3× Gold	300,000
France (SNEP)	Gold	100,000^{*}
Germany (BVMI)	Gold	250,000^{^}
Norway	—	125,000
Switzerland (IFPI Switzerland)	Gold	25,000^{^}
United Kingdom (BPI)	Silver	60,000^{^}
^{*} Sales figures based on certification alone.^{^} Shipments figures based on certification alone.
