= White Xmas Lies =

Studio album by Magne F
- Released: 25 October 2019
- Recorded: 2018
- Venue: Norway
- Genres: Alternative rock, indie rock
- Length: 71:09
- Label: Drabant Music
- Producers: Magne Furuholmen; Bjarne Stensli

Magne F chronology
| A Dot of Black in the Blue of Your Bliss (2008) | White Xmas Lies (2019) |

Singles from White Xmas Lies
- 1. "This Is Now America" Released: 30 August 2019; 2. "The Light We Lost" Released: 24 October 2019; 3. "There Goes Another Year" Released: 1 November 2019; 4. "Father Christmas" Released: 24 December 2019; 5. "A Punch-Up On Boxing Day" Released: 25 December 2019

White Xmas Lies is the third solo album by Magne Furuholmen as Magne F. The album, released on October 25, 2019, comes in three versions: white vinyl, CD and digital. There is also a limited 200 copies edition in white vinyl with exclusive art print. The artwork for the album is created by Furuholmen himself.

In August 2019 Magne Furuholmen released a new solo song titled This is now America on Instagram, which Furuholmen explained was a protest song in direct protest to the Trump administration in an interview with Rolling Stone. The single was published along with a home-made music video directed and edited by his son Thomas Vincent.
On February 21, 2020, a brand new video was released for this song, and it was premiered by Rolling Stone (French edition). The video is both spectacular and disturbing and was made in collaboration with experimental German theatre/performance duo Vinge-Müller and Magne Furuholmen's son Thomas Vincent.

In an interview Furuholmen said he is “ashamed to be part of a Christmas which these days seems to be mostly about buying more and more sh** that no one needs or even really wants…a tacky, superficial celebration in stark contrast to the original Christmas message of hope, charity, and compassion”. Furuholmen also described the album as 'a dark, melancholic christmas record – as an antidote to the cheesy xmas song covers that everyone and his brother churns out these days'.

== Track listing ==
All tracks are written by Magne Furuholmen except Father Christmas (Ray Davies), Hells Bells (Young, Young, Johnson).

| No. | Title | Length |
|---|---|---|
| 1. | "There Goes Another Year" | 5:08 |
| 2. | "The Light We Lost" | 4:32 |
| 3. | "A Punch-up On Boxing Day" | 4:58 |
| 4. | "Caprice Des Dieux" | 4:13 |
| 5. | "This Is Now America" | 5:14 |
| 6. | "White Xmas Lies" | 4:41 |
| 7. | "Differences" | 3:00 |
| 8. | "Revelation Song" | 4:34 |
| 9. | "The Season To Be Melancholy" | 4:26 |
| 10. | "Snow Is Falling" | 4:35 |
| 11. | "Dark Days, Dark Nights" | 5:03 |
| 12. | "Hells Bells" | 3:16 |
| 13. | "So Cold It's Hard To Think" | 4:11 |
| 14. | "A Wintry Silence" | 3:57 |
| 15. | "The Ghost Of Xmas Past" | 3:09 |
| 16. | "Come Back Home" | 3:07 |
| 17. | "Father Christmas" | 3:05 |
| Total length: | | 71:09 |

== Personnel ==
From liner notes:

- Magne Furuholmen - vocals, piano, guitars, keyboards, programming, church organ, percussion, string arrangements
- Karl Oluf Wennerberg - drums, percussion
- Even Ormestad - bass
- Madeleine Ossum - violin, backing vocals on tracks 6 and 8, string arrangements
- Emilie Lidsheim - viola, backing vocals on tracks 6 and 8, string arrangements
- Ingvild Nesdal Sandnes - cello, backing vocals on tracks 6 and 8, string arrangements
- Tini Flaat Mykland - backing vocals on tracks 1, 3 and 8; vocals on track 16
- Morten Qvenild - instruments and programming on tracks 7, 12 and 17
