= Scoundrel Days =

Studio album by a-ha
- Released: 6 October 1986
- Recorded: 1986
- Studios: RG Jones, London, UK
- Genre: Synth-pop
- Length: 38:41
- Label: Warner Bros.
- Producers: Mags; Alan Tarney; Pål Waaktaar

A-ha chronology
Hunting High and Low (1985)	Scoundrel Days (1986)	Stay on These Roads (1988)

Singles from Scoundrel Days
- 1. "I've Been Losing You" Released: 22 September 1986; 2. "Cry Wolf" Released: 24 November 1986; 3. "Maybe, Maybe" Released: December 1986 (Bolivia only); 4. "Manhattan Skyline" Released: February 1987

Scoundrel Days is the second studio album by Norwegian synth-pop band a-ha, released on 6 October 1986 by Warner Bros. Records. A remastered edition with additional tracks was released in 2010.

== Production ==
Scoundrel Days was the second long-player release from a-ha, which was highly anticipated after the success of their first album, Hunting High and Low (1985), which had reached #2 in the United Kingdom's Album Chart, and number 15 in the United States' Billboard 200 in the previous year. Scoundrel Days was recorded in England in early 1986 at RG Jones Recording Studios on Beulah Road in Wimbledon, South-West London. The record was mostly produced by Alan Tarney, who had produced the band's singles "Take On Me" and "The Sun Always Shines on T.V." in the previous year, and it was engineered by Gerry Kitchingham.

The songs were composed by Pal Waaktaar and Magne Furuholmen; the band's vocalist Morten Harket did not contribute to the songwriting as he had on their first album. Waaktaar and Furuholmen also self-produced three of the record's tracks, "I've Been Losing You", "Maybe Maybe", and "Soft Rains of April".

Yamaha DX7 and Roland Juno-60/106 synths were used in the recording of this album, the Roland Juno 60 was used on opening of the song "Manhattan Skyline" (which is the same synth used on the "Take On Me" riff) and the Yamaha DX7 drum sound was used on the opening of "October". "Scoundrel Days" and "Swing of Things" signature sounds were obtained from a PPG Wave. The drums and several other sound effects were from drawn from a Fairlight CMI.

== Single releases ==
"I've Been Losing You" was the first single from the album. It reached number one in Norway and number eight in the United Kingdom. "I've Been Losing You" became the most commercially successful single from the album in Europe.

"Cry Wolf" was the second single from the album. It was the most successful single from the album in the United States, where it peaked at number 14 on the Hot Dance Music/Club Play chart, and at number 50 on the Billboard Hot 100. It was the band's last entry on the latter chart. The single reached the top 40 nearly everywhere else it was released, including top-five chartings in the United Kingdom, Poland and Ireland, reaching number two in Norway. (The lyrics "Night I left the city I dreamt of a Wolf..." are credited to Lauren Savoy whom Pål later married).

"Maybe, Maybe" was the third single released from the album, but was released solely in Bolivia.

"Manhattan Skyline" was the fourth and final single released from the long-player, reaching #13 on the United Kingdom's chart. The song was co-written by keyboardist Magne Furuholmen and guitarist Pål Waaktaar. The song starts with a calm verse in F major, before kicking into a hard rock-style chorus with a guitar riff in D minor. In the official A-ha biography, The Swing of Things, Furuholmen said it was "perhaps one of the most inspired cut and paste-projects that Paul and I did. I wrote the quiet part. Paul wrote the rock part."

== Artwork ==
The cover photography was taken by Norwegian photographer Knut Bry at the Haleakala volcano on Maui, Hawaii, in 1986.

== Release and reception ==
Professional ratings
Review scores
Source	Rating
AllMusic	3.5/5 stars
The Encyclopedia of Popular Music	2/5 stars
Musicfolio	3/5 stars
Q	3/5 stars
Rolling Stone	Unfavourable
Smash Hits	8/10 stars
Sounds	4/5 stars

The album was another big hit by A-ha and sold over 6 million copies worldwide which gave the band international recognition. Scoundrel Days achieved Platinum status in the UK and Switzerland as well as Germany and Brazil. The album reached number two in the European Top 100 Albums chart.

Ned Raggett of AllMusic said, "The opening two songs alone make for one of the best one-two opening punches around: the tense edge of the title track, featuring one of Morten Harket's soaring vocals during the chorus and a crisp, pristine punch in the music, and 'The Swing of Things,' a moody, elegant number with a beautiful synth/guitar arrangement (plus some fine drumming courtesy of studio pro Michael Sturgis) and utterly lovelorn lyrical sentiments that balance on the edge of being overheated without quite going over...The '80s may be long gone, but Scoundrel Days makes clear that not everything was bad back then."

Scoundrel Days included the singles "I've Been Losing You", "Cry Wolf", "Maybe, Maybe", and "Manhattan Skyline". All of the UK singles made the top 20 on UK Singles Chart. "I've Been Losing You" and "Cry Wolf" were the most successful singles from the album, "Cry Wolf" became a minor hit in the US and charted on the Billboard Hot 100, peaking at #50, while "I've Been Losing You" was the most successful single in Europe.

As part of a re-release of their first two albums, Scoundrel Days was expanded and remastered in 2010.

On 6 July 2010, the A-ha albums Hunting High and Low and Scoundrel Days were released as deluxe editions in the US through Rhino Records; both albums debuted in the top 40 of the Billboard Top Internet Sales chart; Hunting High and Low at number 34 and Scoundrel Days at number 36. The remastered reissue of Scoundrel Days reached number 52 in Germany, number 27 in Norway, number 190 in the UK.

== Track listing ==
All tracks are written by Magne Furuholmen and Pål Waaktaar, except where noted.

Side one
No.	Title	Writer(s)	Length
1.	"Scoundrel Days"		3:56
2.	"The Swing of Things"	Waaktaar	4:14
3.	"I've Been Losing You"	Waaktaar	4:24
4.	"October"	Waaktaar	3:48
5.	"Manhattan Skyline"		4:52

Side two
No.	Title	Writer(s)	Length
6.	"Cry Wolf"		4:05
7.	"We're Looking for the Whales"		3:39
8.	"The Weight of the Wind"	Waaktaar	3:57
9.	"Maybe, Maybe"	Furuholmen	2:34
10.	"Soft Rains of April"		3:12

=== 2010 remastered reissue ===
Disc 1 - The Original Album & Bonus Tracks
No.	Title	Writer(s)	Length
11.	"I've Been Losing You" (Extended Version)	Waaktaar	7:03
12.	"Cry Wolf" (Extended Version)		8:12
13.	"Manhattan Skyline" (Extended Remix)		6:49

Disc 2 - Demos, B-Sides & Rarities
No.	Title	Writer(s)	Length
1.	"Scoundrel Days" (Demo)		4:57
2.	"The Swing of Things" (Demo #3)	Waaktaar	4:42
3.	"I've Been Losing You" (Octocon Studio Demo)	Waaktaar	3:16
4.	"October" (Demo)	Waaktaar	2:59
5.	"Manhattan Skyline" (Demo)		4:51
6.	"Cry Wolf" (Demo)		3:33
7.	"We're Looking for the Whales" (Demo)		3:19
8.	"The Weight of the Wind" (Demo)	Waaktaar	4:16
9.	"Maybe, Maybe" (Demo)	Furuholmen	2:28
10.	"Soft Rains of April" (Guitar Version)		2:09
11.	"Scoundrel Days" (Octocon Studio Demo)		3:59
12.	"This Alone Is Love" (Original Version)		4:33
13.	"Days on End"	Waaktaar, Morten Harket	3:08
14.	"Train of Thought" (Live in Croydon)	Waaktaar	6:38
15.	"I've Been Losing You" (Live in Croydon)	Waaktaar	5:07
16.	"The Blue Sky" (Live in Croydon)	Waaktaar	5:13
17.	"We're Looking for the Whales" (Live in Croydon)		6:44
18.	"Cry Wolf" (Live in Croydon)		5:55

Download-only bonus tracks
No.	Title	Writer(s)	Length
19.	"I've Been Losing You" (Dub)	Waaktaar	4:22
20.	"Soft Rains of April" (Piano Version)		2:23
21.	"The Swing of Things" (Demo #1)	Waaktaar	4:06
22.	"I've Been Losing You" (Early Demo)	Waaktaar	4:11

== Personnel ==
A-ha

- Morten Harket – lead and backing vocals
- Magne Furuholmen – keyboards, bass and drum programming, backing vocals
- Pål Waaktaar – guitars, drum programming, backing vocals

with:

- Graham Prescott – strings (1)
- Leif Karsten Johansen – bass guitar (3)
- Michael Sturgis – drums (2, 3, 10)
- Øystein Jevanord – drums (6)

Production

- Alan Tarney – producer (1, 2, 4–8), mixing
- Magne Furuholmen – producer (3, 9, 10)
- Paul Waaktaar – producer (3, 9, 10)
- Gerry Kitchingham – engineer
- John Hudson – mixing
- Jeri McManus Heiden – art direction, design
- Kim Champagne – design
- Knut Bry – photography

== Charts ==
=== Weekly charts ===
Weekly chart performance for Scoundrel Days
Chart (1986–1987)	Peak position
Argentinian Albums (CAPIF)	11
Australian Albums (Kent Music Report)	17
Austrian Albums (Ö3 Austria)	9
Canada Top Albums/CDs (RPM)	31
Dutch Albums (Album Top 100)	6
European Albums (Music & Media)	2
Finnish Albums (Suomen virallinen lista)	9
French Albums (IFOP)	7
German Albums (Offizielle Top 100)	4
Icelandic Albums (Tónlist)	2
Italian Albums (Musica e dischi)	11
Japanese Albums (Music Labo)	7
New Zealand Albums (RMNZ)	4
Norwegian Albums (VG-lista)	1
Swedish Albums (Sverigetopplistan)	11
Swiss Albums (Schweizer Hitparade)	6
UK Albums (Official Charts)	2
US Billboard 200	74

Weekly chart performance for Scoundrel Days (2010 reissue)
Chart (2010)	Peak position
German Albums (Offizielle Top 100)	52
Norwegian Albums (VG-lista)	27
UK Albums (Official Charts)	190

=== Year-end charts ===
1986 year-end chart performance for Scoundrel Days
Chart (1986)	Position
Dutch Albums (Album Top 100)	76
European Albums (Music & Media)	64
French Albums (IFOP)	6
Italian Albums (FIMI)	46
Norwegian Autumn Period Albums (VG-lista)	1
UK Albums (OCC)	31

1987 year-end chart performance for Scoundrel Days
Chart (1987)	Position
Dutch Albums (Album Top 100)	96
European Albums (Music & Media)	20
German Albums (Offizielle Top 100)	35

== Certifications ==
Certifications for Scoundrel Days
Region	Certification	Certified units/sales
Brazil (Pro-Música Brasil)	Platinum	250,000^{*}
Canada (Music Canada)	Platinum	100,000
France (SNEP)	Platinum	500,000
Germany (BVMI)	Platinum	500,000^{^}
New Zealand (RMNZ)	Platinum	15,000^{^}
Norway (IFPI Norway)	Platinum	100,000
Sweden (GLF)	Gold	50,000
Switzerland (IFPI Switzerland)	Platinum	50,000^{^}
United Kingdom (BPI)	Platinum	300,000^{^}
^{*} Sales figures based on certification alone.^{^} Shipments figures based on certification alone.
