= Bridges (band) =

Norwegian musical group (1978–1981)

- Origin: Oslo, Norway
- Genres: Psychedelic rock; blues rock
- Years active: 1978–1981
- Past members: Paul Waaktaar-Savoy; Magne Furuholmen; Viggo Bondi; Erik Hagelien; Øystein Jevanord

Bridges were a Norwegian rock band formed in Oslo, Norway, in 1978. It is notable for being the predecessor to synth pop band a-ha. The band released their debut album, Fakkeltog, in 1980. Their second album, Våkenatt, was recorded within the following year, but not released until 2018.

== History ==
Paul Waaktaar-Savoy and Magne Furuholmen both grew up in Manglerud, a suburb of Oslo, Norway. During fifth grade, Waaktaar, then a drummer, recruited Furuholmen as a guitarist and vocalist for his band. Waaktaar later learned to play the guitar and the band briefly changed their name to Spider Empire.

After recruiting Viggo Bondi on bass guitar and Erik Hagelien on drums, the band started to record demos. Waaktaar later convinced Furuholmen to play keyboards on their new songs. The band played live several times during 1978 and 1979, including one notable concert where Morten Harket was in the audience. Harket would later go on to form a-ha with Waaktaar and Furuholmen.

Øystein Jevanord replaced Hagelien on drums as the band went into the studio to record their debut album, Fakkeltog. The band financed the recording and the publishing of the album, which was released in 1980.

The band went into studio again and had finished their second album, Våkenatt, by the summer of 1981. However, the mood within the band had deteriorated during the recording process, and the band played their last concert later that summer, without releasing their newly finished album. Waaktaar and Furuholmen planned to continue their musical careers in London, but Bondi and Jevanord declined, and Bridges split up.

In August 2018, Våkenatt was finally released by Rockheim Musical Archives, 38 years after it was recorded.

== Discography ==
- Fakkeltog (1980)
- Våkenatt (2018)

== Band members ==
- Paul Waaktaar-Savoy – lead vocals, guitars (1978–1981)
- Magne Furuholmen – keyboards, vocals (1978–1981)
- Viggo Bondi – bass (1978–1981)
- Erik Hagelien – drums (1978–1979)
- Øystein Jevanord – drums (1979–1981)
