= Hotel Oslo =

Studio album by Magne Furuholmen
- Released: 1997
- Genre: Alternative rock; indie rock
- Length: 43:00
- Label: Norsk Plateproduksjon
- Producer: Timbersound

Magne Furuholmen chronology
Ti Kniver I Hjertet (1994)	Hotel Oslo (1997)	Hermetic (1998)

Singles from Hotel Oslo
- 1. "In The Hands Of Fools (Norwegian radio promo)" Released: 1997; 2. "We’ll never speak again (radio promo)" Released: 1997

Hotel Oslo is the soundtrack of the Norwegian movie of the same name.

The album is written and performed by Magne Furuholmen, Freddie Wadling, Kjetil Bjerkestrand. Other artists who collaborated are: Anneli Drecker (singer on We'll Never Speak Again), Per Lindvall (drums), Eivind Aarset (guitar), Jonny Sjo (bass), Bjorg Vaernes (cello), Henninge Batnes (viola).

== Track listing ==
No.	Title	Length
1.	"Con Sordino"	1:06
2.	"In the Hands of Fools"	4:33
3.	"City View"	1:22
4.	"A Room for Thought"	3:25
5.	"Witchi Tai to the Sharp – Canopies of Your Broken Heart"	4:07
6.	"Corridor"	2:04
7.	"We'll Never Speak Again"	6:50
8.	"I Remember You"	2:17
9.	"Half Remembering, Half Trying to Forget"	4:33
10.	"Shaft Man"	2:03
11.	"White Walls, a Door and a Window"	1:08
12.	"The City Breathes a Stinking Rhythm"	3:16
13.	"Freddie's Hymn: Ismael – Sea of Blood"	3:09
14.	"The Postcard You Never Sent: - Greetings from Hotel Oslo"	3:29
Total length:		43:00
