= Cast in Steel =

Studio album by a-ha
- Released: 4 September 2015
- Recorded: 2014–2015
- Studios: Atlantis Studios and Studio Brun (Stockholm, Sweden); Athletic Sound (Halden, Norway); Albatross Recorders (Oslo, Norway); Real World Studios (Wiltshire, England); The Alabaster Room, Systems Two Recording Studios and Electric Lady Studios (New York City, New York, US); Little Big Sound (Bellevue, Tennessee, US)
- Genres: Synth-pop; alternative rock; pop rock
- Length: 47:01 (CD); 38:44 (vinyl)
- Labels: We Love Music; Polydor; Universal
- Producers: Magne Furuholmen; Morten Harket; Peter Kvint; Erik Ljunggren; Jon O'Mahony; Steve Osborne; Alan Tarney; Pål Waaktaar-Savoy

A-ha chronology
Ending on a High Note: The Final Concert (2011)	Cast in Steel (2015)	Time and Again: The Ultimate a-ha (2016)

Singles from Cast in Steel
- 1. "Under the Makeup" Released: 3 July 2015; 2. "The Wake" Released: 28 August 2015; 3. "Forest Fire" Released: 15 September 2015; 4. "Cast in Steel (Steve Osborne Version)" Released: 12 February 2016; 5. "Objects in the Mirror (Steve Osborne Version)" Released: 12 February 2016

Cast in Steel is the tenth studio album by Norwegian synth-pop band A-ha. The album was released on 4 September 2015 by We Love Music and Polydor. It is their first studio album since Foot of the Mountain (2009), following their second reunion in early 2015.

Cast in Steel is the first a-ha album to use the original band logo since Memorial Beach from 1993, and the first album to be produced by Alan Tarney since Stay on These Roads (1988).

== Background and recording ==
Following the release of their ninth studio album, Foot of the Mountain, a-ha announced that they would retire as a band. In 2015, however, the band announced that they would re-unite for a two-year period and release Cast in Steel, followed by a world tour to promote the album. Cast in Steel was released on 4 September 2015, shortly before a-ha performed in Brazil at Rock in Rio on 27 September for the festival's 30th anniversary.

Initially Pål Waaktaar-Savoy and Morten Harket began recording the album in New York without Magne Furuholmen. Waaktaar-Savoy said of the process: "It began quite small with Morten dropping by my studio now and then, and I played some of my new songs for him. Then he recorded his vocals on the songs he liked and the rest we didn't use. That continued until we had ten to twelve songs." He also revealed that the three members of a-ha were never present in the same studio during the recording of the album, and said: "It often ends up like this, and many bands do it this way. But I do miss the feeling of us being in the same studio, working on the same song in real time."

Furuholmen has said the reunion wasn't his decision: "The other two wanted to do it, and I had to decide: do I block it, let them do it without me, or make a fool of myself, with my statements about this being the end."

== Singles ==
"Under the Makeup" was released as the album's first single internationally on 3 July 2015. The music video was shot in Telemark in Norway and stars Danish actress Sofie Gråbøl and Swedish actress Frida Farrell.

On 19 August 2015, "The Wake" was premiered on BBC Radio 2. The song was released as the album's second single in the United Kingdom on 28 August 2015.

A-ha performed the album's third single "Forest Fire" on 3 September 2015 at the 2015 Radiopreis-Gala in Germany. On 15 September 2015 a lyric video was released on YouTube. "Forest Fire" was added to the BBC Radio 2 playlist on 28 October 2015 as the third single from the album in the UK.

The Steve Osborne remix of "Cast in Steel" was released as an international single on 12 February 2016. On the same date, the Osborne remix of "Objects In The Mirror" was released as the fourth single in the UK.

== Commercial performance ==
Cast in Steel debuted at number eight on the UK Albums Chart, selling 7,828 copies in its first week. It is a-ha's sixth Top 10 album in the United Kingdom. The album debuted at number four on the German Albums Chart, and became the 99th best-selling album of 2015.

== Track listing ==
No.	Title	Lyrics	Music	Producer(s)	Length
1.	"Cast in Steel"	Pål Waaktaar-Savoy	Waaktaar-Savoy	Savoy, Erik Ljunggren, Peter Kvint^{[a]}, Morten Harket^{[a]}	3:50
2.	"Under the Makeup"	Waaktaar-Savoy	Waaktaar-Savoy	Waaktaar-Savoy, Ljunggren, Kvint^{[a]}, Harket^{[a]}	3:25
3.	"The Wake"	Harket, Ole Sverre Olsen	Harket, Kvint	Harket, Kvint	3:45
4.	"Forest Fire"	Magne Furuholmen	Furuholmen, Harket, Martin Terefe, Kvint	Steve Osborne, Furuholmen, Ljunggren, Kvint^{[a]}, Harket^{[a]}	3:54
5.	"Objects in the Mirror"	Furuholmen	Furuholmen	Osborne, Furuholmen, Ljunggren, Kvint^{[a]}, Harket^{[a]}	4:14
6.	"Door Ajar"	Waaktaar-Savoy	Waaktaar-Savoy	Waaktaar-Savoy, Alan Tarney, John O'Mahony^{[b]}	3:46
7.	"Living at the End of the World"	Harket, Olsen	Harket, Kvint	Harket, Kvint	4:06
8.	"Mythomania"	Furuholmen	Furuholmen	Furuholmen, Ljunggren, Kvint^{[a]}, Harket^{[a]}	3:49
9.	"She's Humming a Tune"	Waaktaar-Savoy	Waaktaar-Savoy	Waaktaar-Savoy, Ljunggren, O'Mahony^{[b]}	4:02
10.	"Shadow Endeavors"	Waaktaar-Savoy	Waaktaar-Savoy	Waaktaar-Savoy, Tarney, O'Mahony^{[b]}	4:21
11.	"Giving Up the Ghost"	Furuholmen	Furuholmen	Furuholmen, Ljunggren, Kvint^{[a]}, Harket^{[a]}	4:15
12.	"Goodbye Thompson"	Waaktaar-Savoy	Waaktaar-Savoy	Waaktaar-Savoy, Tarney, O'Mahony^{[b]}	3:34

Deluxe edition (bonus tracks)
No.	Title	Lyrics	Music	Producer(s)	Length
1.	"The End of the Affair"	Furuholmen	Furuholmen	Furuholmen, Ljunggren	3:31
2.	"Mother Nature Goes to Heaven" (original version)	Waaktaar-Savoy	Waaktaar-Savoy	a-ha	4:33
3.	"Nothing Is Keeping You Here" (original version)	Waaktaar-Savoy	Waaktaar-Savoy	a-ha	4:41
4.	"Shadowside" (demo version)	Waaktaar-Savoy	Waaktaar-Savoy	a-ha, Ljunggren	4:16
5.	"Start the Simulator" (stereophonic mix)	Waaktaar-Savoy	Waaktaar-Savoy	Mark Saunders, Roland Spremberg	5:19
6.	"Foot of the Mountain" (Mark Saunders remix)	Waaktaar-Savoy	Waaktaar-Savoy, Furuholmen	Saunders	4:18

=== Vinyl edition ===
Side A

1. Cast in Steel - 3:50
2. Under the Makeup - 3:25
3. The Wake - 3:45
4. Forest Fire - 3:54
5. Objects in the Mirror - 4:14

Side B

1. Door Ajar - 3:46
2. Living at the End of the World - 4:06
3. Mythomania - 3:49
4. Shadow Endeavors - 4:21
5. Goodbye Thompson - 3:34

Notes

- ^{^[a]} signifies a vocal producer
- ^{^[b]} signifies pre-production

== Personnel ==
=== a-ha ===
- Morten Harket – vocals
- Magne Furuholmen – keyboards, vocals
- Pål Waaktaar-Savoy – guitars, vocals

Additional musicians

- Erik Ljunggren – programming (1, 4, 5, 8, 9, 13)
- Chuck Zwicky – programming (1, 6, 10, 12)
- Rob Schwimmer – Theremin (2)
- Peter Kvint – programming (3, 7), guitars (3, 7), bass (3, 7)
- Steve Osborne – keyboards (4), programming (4), guitars (4), bass (4)
- Florian Reutter – programming (4)
- Alan Tarney – keyboards (6, 10, 12), guitars (6, 10, 12), additional backing vocals (6, 10, 12)
- Eliot Leigh – programming (6, 10, 12)
- Kurt Uenala – programming (6, 10, 12)
- Even Ormestad – bass (1, 2, 9)
- Karl Oluf Wennerberg – drums (1, 2, 4, 5, 8, 9, 11, 13)
- Per Lindvall – drums (7)
- Joe Mardin – drums (12)
- Macedonian Radio Symphony Orchestra – orchestra (1, 2)
- Lars Horntveth – orchestral arrangement (1, 2)
- Bylund Strings – strings (7)
- Mattias Bylund – string arrangements (7)
- Sarighani Reist – cello (5, 11)
- Julie Tanner – cello (5, 11)
- Monisa Angell – viola (5, 11)
- Kristin Wilkinson – viola (5, 11)
- David Angell – violin (5, 11)
- David Davidson – violin (5, 11), string arrangements (5, 11)
- Conni Ellisor – violin (5, 11)
- Mary Kathryn Vanosdale – violin (5, 11)

Technical and Design

- Kai Andersen – recording
- John Brant – recording
- Janne Hansson – recording
- Dag Erik Johansen – recording
- Peter Kvint – recording, mixing (3)
- Eliot Leigh – recording
- Erik Ljunggren – recording
- Even Enersen Omnestad – recording
- Steve Osborne – recording
- Max Ross – recording
- Bobby Shin – recording
- George Tanderø – recording
- Chuck Zwicky – recording
- Cenzo Townshend – mixing (1, 8, 9, 11)
- John O'Mahony – mixing (2)
- Simon Nordberg – mixing (3, 7)
- Maret Pompetzki – mixing (4, 5)
- Ren Swan – mixing (6, 10, 12)
- John Davis – mastering at Metropolis Mastering (London, UK)
- Jeri Heiden – art direction, design
- Glen Nakasako – art direction, design
- Just Loomis – photography
- Lars Gundersen – photography
- Harald Wiik – management

== Charts ==
=== Weekly charts ===
Weekly chart performance for Cast in Steel
Chart (2015)	Peak position
Austrian Albums (Ö3 Austria)	13
Belgian Albums (Ultratop Flanders)	35
Belgian Albums (Ultratop Wallonia)	24
Croatian International Albums (HDU)	3
Czech Albums (ČNS IFPI)	7
Danish Albums (Hitlisten)	40
Dutch Albums (Album Top 100)	5
French Albums (SNEP)	84
German Albums (Offizielle Top 100)	4
Greek Albums (IFPI)	30
Hungarian Albums (MAHASZ)	38
Irish Albums (IRMA)	33
Norwegian Albums (VG-lista)	2
Polish Albums (ZPAV)	43
Scottish Albums (Official Charts)	7
Spanish Albums (Promusicae)	38
Swiss Albums (Schweizer Hitparade)	9
UK Albums (Official Charts)	8

=== Year-end charts ===
Year-end chart performance for Cast in Steel
Chart (2015)	Position
German Albums (Offizielle Top 100)	99
