= Magne Furuholmen =

Norwegian musician and visual artist (born 1962)

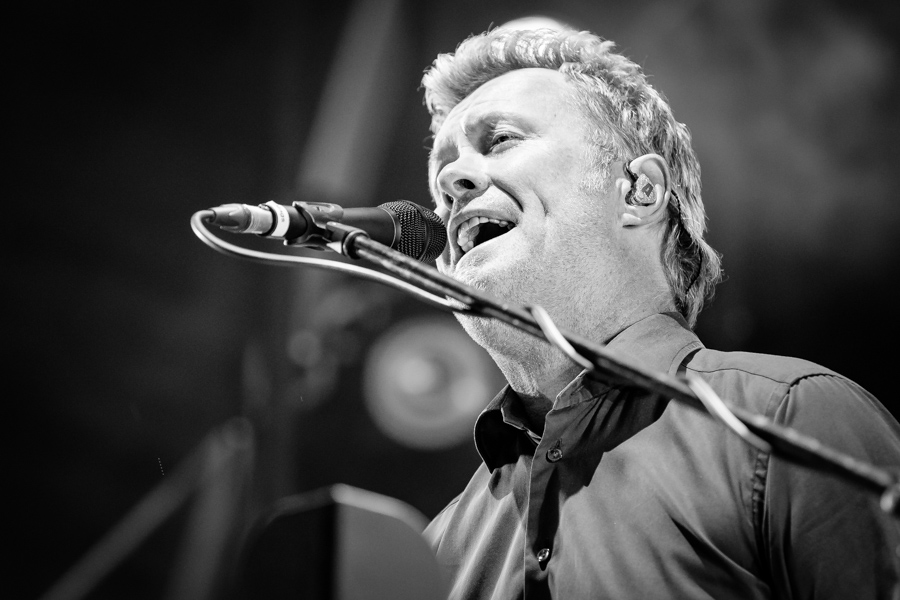
- Furuholmen performing in 2018

Background information
- Also known as: Mags, Magne F
- Born: 1 November 1962 (age 63); Oslo, Norway
- Genres: Synth-pop; new wave; alternative rock; indie rock
- Occupations: Musician; songwriter; visual artist; painter
- Instruments: Keyboards; guitar; vocals
- Years active: 1980–present
- Labels: Passionfruit; Polydor; ZYX; Drabant Music
- Member of: A-ha; Apparatjik
- Formerly of: Bridges; Timbersound
- Website: magnefuruholmen.com

Magne Furuholmen (born 1 November 1962) is a Norwegian musician and visual artist. Also known by his stage name Mags, he is the keyboardist of the synth-pop band A-ha and co-wrote hits such as "Take On Me", "Stay on These Roads", "Manhattan Skyline", "Cry Wolf", "Forever Not Yours", "Analogue (All I Want)", "Minor Earth Major Sky", "Touchy!", "You Are the One", "Move To Memphis" and "Foot of the Mountain". A-ha has sold more than 50 million albums worldwide. He was named Knight First Class of the Order of St. Olav by King Harald for his services to Norwegian music and his international success.

Furuholmen is also a visual artist with solo exhibitions held in Norway, the UK, and elsewhere in Europe. His work is represented in private and public institutions and museums worldwide, among them The Norwegian State Archives, Bibliothèque Nationale de France, and others. In 2016, Magne Furuholmen undertook his biggest commission to date and created the largest ceramic sculpture park in Scandinavia titled "Imprints", which is located in Fornebu outside Oslo. In 2017, the University of Agder in Norway nominated five new honorary doctors in connection with the university's 10th anniversary. The degree was awarded for significant scientific or artistic efforts. Magne Furuholmen was one of the recipients.

== Music career ==
=== Bridges ===
Furuholmen (keyboards and vocals) formed Bridges with Paul Waaktaar-Savoy (guitars and vocals), drummers Erik Hagelien and Øystein Jevanord, and bassist Viggo Bondi. In 1980, Bridges released their only album, the self-financed LP Fakkeltog. Although the title is Norwegian (meaning torchlight procession), the songs are in English. At the request of A-ha frontman Morten Harket, A-ha performed the Fakkeltog song "The Vacant" (renamed "Sox of the Fox") during their 2017 MTV Unplugged performance, released as MTV Unplugged – Summer Solstice.

=== A-ha ===
Furuholmen has been the keyboardist with A-ha since their formation in 1982, though he also plays guitar. He composed the synth-riff of "Take On Me", when he was only 15 years old. In an interview from 2014, he revealed it was thanks to Morten Harket that they used the "Take On Me" riff saying he would quit the band if they didn't. "Take On Me" became their biggest hit and was the top 5th streamed song of the 20th century in December 2018. The synth-riff was sampled in the American hit-song "Feel This Moment" featuring Pitbull and Christina Aguilera in 2012.

Magne Furuholmen has performed live together with Chris Martin of Coldplay, who introduced Mags as "the best keyboard player in the world".

Furuholmen co-wrote most of the a-ha classics with Paul Waaktaar-Savoy, including "Stay on These Roads", "Manhattan Skyline", "Foot of the Mountain", "Cry Wolf", "Move to Memphis", "Minor Earth Major Sky", "Analogue (All I Want)", "Scoundrel Days", "Touchy!", "You Are the One", "Love Is Reason", "Early Morning", "I Call Your Name", "We're Looking for the Whales", "Soft Rains of April", "I Dream Myself Alive", "Little Black Heart", "The Company Man", "The Bandstand", and the band's first and biggest hit "Take On Me". In the 2010 a-ha biography "The Swing of Things", Furuholmen describes one highlight for him: "Stay on These Roads" was a song that I, unusually enough, showed to Morten first – in Paul's apartment. Morten had a brilliant suggestion for a change in the chorus. That song is potentially the best I've ever written". In the biography, Magne also commented: "Manhattan Skyline" was perhaps one of the most inspired cut and paste projects that Paul and I did. I wrote the quiet part. Paul wrote the rock part."

Magne Furuholmen has written or co-written the majority of songs on albums like Lifelines and Analogue, and his co-writing and single track contributions make up most of the tracks on Scoundrel Days, East of the Sun, West of the Moon, Foot of the Mountain and MTV Unplugged – Summer Solstice as well. Mags has written songs such as "Cosy Prisons", "Lifelines", "This is Our Home", "I Wish I Cared", "Mythomania", "Objects in the Mirror", "The End Of The Affair", "Giving Up the Ghost", "Forest Fire" and "Maybe, Maybe" for a-ha, and he takes lead vocals on a couple of recorded album songs with a-ha including "The Summers of Our Youth". When a-ha went on hiatus in 1994, Furuholmen began working on other music projects. The band reconvened in 1998, though announced they would split in 2010.

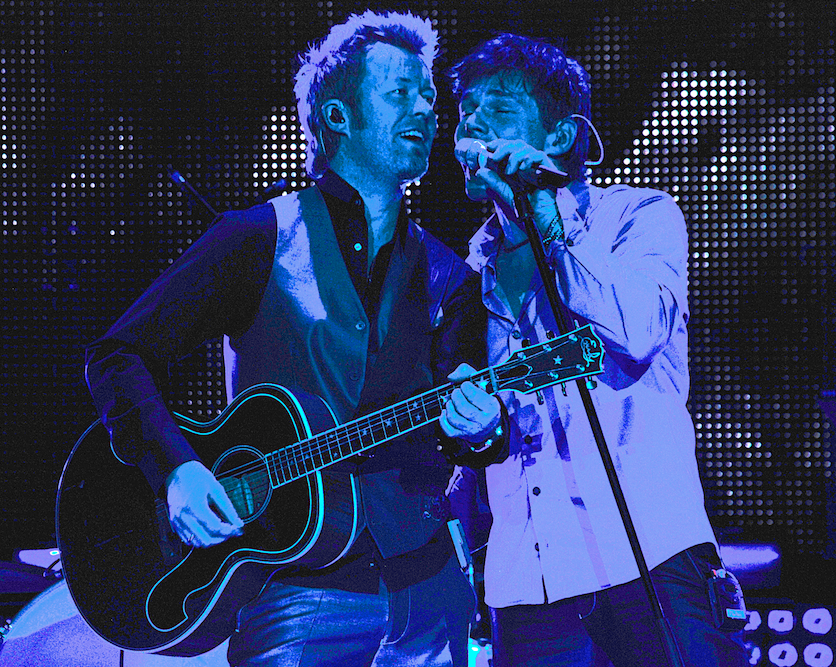
Mags and Morten in Manchester 2010

In 2012, the three members of a-ha, Morten Harket, Magne Furuholmen and Paul Waaktaar Savoy, were appointed Knights of the 1st Class of the Royal Norwegian Order of St. Olav for their contribution to Norwegian music. The Royal Norwegian Order of St. Olav is granted as a reward for distinguished services to their country and mankind. The official ceremony took place on 6 November 2012.

=== Solo projects and collaborations ===
Furuholmen's projects outside of A-ha include Timbersound, formed in 1994 with Kjetil Bjerkestrand, and later, Swedish singer, Freddie Wadling. Their work has been used on film soundtracks such as Ti Kniver I Hjertet (1994), "Hotel Oslo" (1997) which also featured vocals by Anneli Drecker, 1732 Høtten (1998) where the album Hermetic is featured.

Furuholmen released his first solo album, Past Perfect Future Tense, in 2004, with appearances from Guy Berryman and Will Champion of Coldplay, and from Andy Dunlop of the Scottish band Travis.

In early 2005, Furuholmen featured on a Cat Stevens (Yusuf Islam) song, titled "Indian Ocean", about the 2004 Indian Ocean earthquake and tsunami disaster. The song featured Indian composer/producer A. R. Rahman, Magne Furuholmen and Travis drummer Neil Primrose. Proceeds of the single went to help orphans in Banda Aceh, one of the areas worst affected by the tsunami, through Yusuf's Small Kindness charity.

In 2008, Magne Furuholmen released his second solo album, A Dot of Black in the Blue of Your Bliss, which includes tracks like "The Longest Night", which later was made into A-ha song "Foot of the Mountain".

In 2012, Magne Furuholmen was a mentor on the show The Voice – Norges beste stemme. His talent Martin Halla won the contest and had his first album produced by Furuholmen himself who is also a songwriter/producer for other artists.

In 2014, Furuholmen agreed to compose the songs and supervise the recordings for the Norwegian film "Beatles".

In August 2019, Magne Furuholmen released a new solo song,"This is now America" on Instagram, which was the first single from his 2019 album White Xmas Lies. Furuholmen explained that this song was a protest song in direct protest to the Trump administration in an interview with Rolling Stone. The single was published along with a home-made music video directed and edited by his son Thomas. On 25 October 2019, the album was officially released, and in an interview Furuholmen said he is "ashamed to be part of a Christmas which these days seems to be mostly about buying more and more sh** that no one needs or even really wants…a tacky, superficial celebration in stark contrast to the original Christmas message of hope, charity, and compassion". Furuholmen also described the album as 'a dark, melancholic Christmas record – as an antidote to the cheesy xmas song covers that everyone and his brother churns out these days'. The artwork for the album is created by Furuholmen himself.

On 19 June 2020, Furuholmen releases a new single, "Troubled Times", which is a cover of a song by Fountains of Wayne. He also releases a video made with clips sent by fans following an invitation made on Instagram.

=== Apparatjik ===
In 2008, Furuholmen collaborated with Coldplay bassist Guy Berryman and Mew vocalist Jonas Bjerre under the brand name of Apparatjik for the theme to the BBC Two series, Amazon. The theme was made available (along with exclusive tracks from various other artists) on the Survival International charity album, Songs for Survival.

In 2010, Apparatjik released their first album, We Are Here, a digital album also available physically via their website. Apparatjik has performed in a cube at venues like The Neue Nationalgalerie in Berlin, The Serpentine Gallery in London, The State Museum of Denmark in Copenhagen and The Norwegian National Gallery. Apparatjik is described by themselves as an artist collective falling between art and mainstream culture, but happy in the fall.

Magne announced on Jo Wiley's show on BBC Radio 2 in October 2010 that he intends to work with his friends in MEW and Coldplay after retiring from A-ha in December.

== Visual arts ==
Furuholmen's work is represented in institutions and collections in his native Norway and worldwide. Among his permanent public commissions are 'Resonance' for The city of Bergen, as well as his largest commission to date – a ceramic sculpturepark in the Oslo region consisting of 50 tonnes of clay, opened in June 2016.

Magne Furuholmen is also a well known visual arts artist working with glass, paint, etching and woodcut and has exhibited his works all around the world.

His art has been displayed at The Henie Onstad Kunstsenter in Oslo, and he has also shown his work at The London Art Fair. In 2001, Furuholmen was commissioned to design an official Norwegian postage stamp. In 2005, he decorated the 11 floors of the Royal Caribbean International cruiseship Adventure of the Seas with sheets of glass of his work.

2014: Furuholmen started working on his biggest commission to date, for what ended up being Scandinavia's largest ceramic sculpture-park.

2015: Magne exhibited works in Edinburgh, and his collaboration with Dovecot Studios of Edinburgh for his "Peeling a Glass Onion" exhibition was made into a shortfilm shown on the BBC-website.

In 2025, the National Arts Club staged an exhibition of 49 prints by Furuholmen, inspired by Henri Matisse's designs for the interior and vestments of the Chapelle du Rosaire de Vence.

=== Main solo exhibitions ===
- 1989 Maleri
- 1995 Kutt / Cuts
- 1997 In Concert
- 1996, 1998 Y Project
- 1998 Credit
- 1999 New Works
- 2001 Pincette
- 2003 Foci
- 2004 Payne's Gray
- 2004 Stjerneskutt
- 2006 Building Ruins
- 2006 Morceaux Choisis
- 2007 Monologues
- 2007 Scrabble
- 2007 Anticlimax
- 2007 Climax
- 2009 Camera
- 2009 Alpha Beta
- 2011 Echo
- 2011 Futura Plus
- 2012 Bouquet
- 2013 Norwegian Wood
- 2014 Norwegian Wood Remix
- 2014 Self-Portraits
- 2015 Peeling a Glass Onion
- 2016 Marginalia, Texture (with Queen Sonja)
- 2019 IGNIS
- 2025 DTR presents Magne Furuholmen (National Arts Club)

=== Commissions ===
- 2007 Climax The Nobel Peace Center, Oslo, Norway
- 2009 Climax Sculpture Hydro, Norway
- 2009 Confusion, Bølgen & Moi (with Snøhetta), Oslo, Norway
- 2010 Umsteiger, commission, Berlin, Germany
- 2012 Bouquet Wall Painting, Asker, Norway
- 2012 Code One, commission, Aglaia
- 2012–2013 Aker Solutions, Fornebu, Norway

=== Works on permanent display ===
- 2003 Resonance, Bergen, Norway
- 2012 Rudolph the chrome-nosed reindeer, Tjuvholmen, Oslo, Norway (with Apparatjik)
- 2013 The Sound of Silence, Tjuvholmen, Oslo, Norway (with Apparatjik)
- 2016 Imprints, Fornebu, Oslo, Norway: sculpture park

== Personal life ==
Furuholmen was born in Oslo, the son of jazz trumpeter Kåre Furuholmen (1940–1969) and Anne-Lise Furuholmen (b. 1941). He was raised in Manglerud, Oslo (along with A-ha colleague and co-writer Paul Waaktaar-Savoy). He has one sister, Line, and two half brothers, Thorstein and Trygve Christian. His father, a jazz musician who played trumpet with Bent Sølves Orkester, was killed in an aeroplane crash over Drammen, south of Oslo in 1969, when Magne was just six. Remarkably, this very accident was witnessed by a nine-year-old Morten Harket, thirteen years before the two were to meet for the first time.

Furuholmen married Heidi Rydjord, his high school sweetheart, on 8 August 1992, in the garden of their Nesøya home. They have two sons, Thomas Vincent (born 19 April 1990) and Filip Clements (born 2 October 1993).

Furuholmen has previously revealed in interviews that he suffered from a heart disease, however in 2016 he told Norwegian Newspaper "Bergensavisen" that he had a whole new life after undergoing surgery in 2012.

== Discography ==
- 1980 Fakkeltog (Bridges)
- 1985 Hunting High and Low (A-ha)
- 1986 Scoundrel Days (A-ha)
- 1987 The Living Daylights – 007 James Bond Soundtrack (A-ha)
- 1988 Stay on These Roads (A-ha)
- 1990 East of the Sun, West of the Moon (A-ha)
- 1991 Headlines & Deadlines (A-ha)
- 1993 Memorial Beach (A-ha)
- 1994 Hope To Die / Ti Kniver I Hjertet (soundtrack, Timbersound)
- 1996 Hotel Oslo (Timbersound)
- 1996 Archivalia Vol. 1 (producer)
- 1998 Hermetic (Timbersound)
- 2000 Minor Earth Major Sky (A-ha)
- 2001 Dragonfly, EP
- 2002 Lifelines (A-ha)
- 2004 Past Perfect Future Tense (Magne F)
- 2005 Analogue (A-ha)
- 2005 Indian Ocean, Yusuf Islam, single (performer)
- 2007 The longest night in Shanghai – (Umi No Shanghai) soundtrack (writer/performer on Bass Theme, writer of Guy Romance Theme)
- 2008 A Dot of Black in the Blue of Your Bliss (Magne F)
- 2008 Thor Heyerdahl – På jakt etter paradiset soundtrack (writer)
- 2008 Ferreting, song (Apparatjik)
- 2009 Foot of the Mountain (A-ha)
- 2010 We Are Here (Apparatjik)
- 2010 The Bolshevik Box (Apparatjik, special edition of the album We Are Here)
- 2010 Word Symphony (Limited Edition) (Magne F)
- 2010 a-ha 25 (A-ha)
- 2012 Square Peg in a Round Hole (Apparatjik)
- 2012 If You Can, Solve This Jumble, Lowell, album (writer and producer)
- 2013 Winter Days, Martin Halla, album (writer and producer)
- 2013 Breathe, Backstreet Boys, single (writer)
- 2013 Majors & Minors, Marius Beck (producer)
- 2014 Beatles movie Soundtrack, (writer, performer)
- 2014 Undo My Heart, Tini (writer, producer)
- 2015 Cast in Steel (A-ha)
- 2018 Våkenatt (Bridges)
- 2019 White Xmas Lies (Magne F)
- 2022 True North (A-ha)
- 2025 living with ourselves

== Bibliography ==
- 1995 Kutt / Cuts, Henie Onstad Art Center
- 1997 Blue Note Boulevards, Grøndahl Dreyer,
- 2002 Lerkrukker & Glasmosaik, Liebeskind, Denmark
- 2004 Foci, Lillehammer Art Museum
- 2004 Stjerneskudt, Nansensgades Antikvariat
- 2004 Stjerneskutt, Press Forlag
- 2004 Payne's Gray, Hatje Cantz
- 2004 Art in the Statoil Collection
- 2005 Norwegian Artist Yearbook
- 2005 Paul Stolper Editions
- 2006 Gap Hanoi, OCA
- 2007 Monologues
- 2009 This Is The Way We See It, Erich Weiss
- 2010 Alphabets – A miscellany of letters, black dog publishing UK, ISBN 978-1-907317-09-5
- Landscape and Room, a selection from H.M. Queen Sonja's art collection ISBN 978-82-8294-001-6
- 2011 Electric – Some Magazine ISBN 978-3-86019-083-8
- 2012 Illustration in Norwegian Books
- 2012 Music, Some magazine ISBN 978-3-86019-092-0
- 2012 I wish this was a Song, Museet for Samtidskunst, ISBN 978-82-8154-068-2
- 2013 In Transit (Monograph), Press Publishing, ISBN 978-82-7547-413-9
- 2016 QSPA 5, Forlaget Press, ISBN 978-82-328-0096-4
- 2017 Imprints, Forlaget Press, ISBN 9788232800971
