= A-ha =

Norwegian synth-pop band

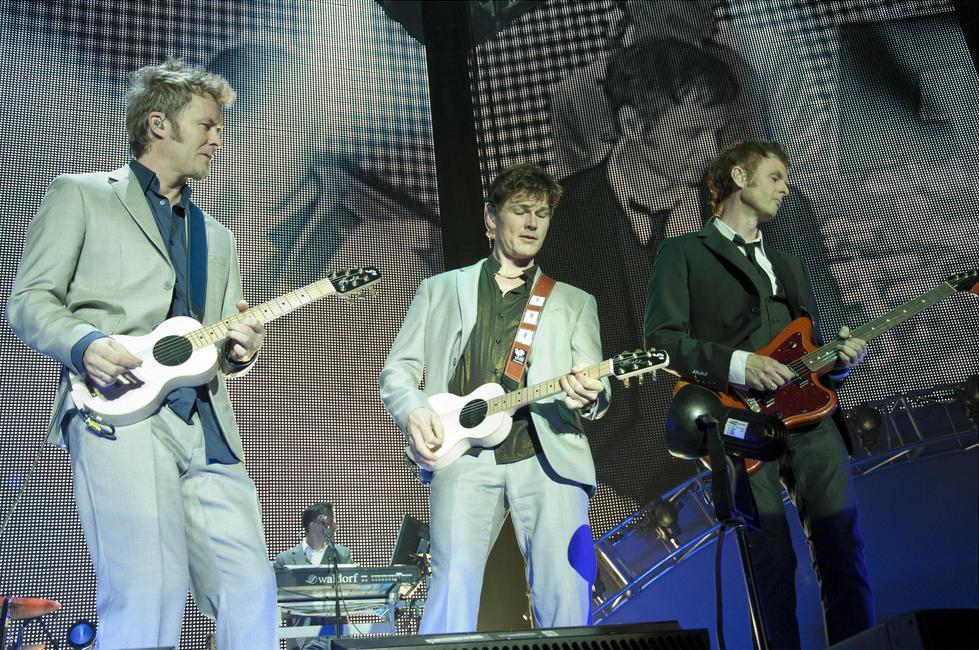
- A-ha in concert at Palacio Vistalegre, Madrid, Spain, in 2010 (left to right: Magne Furuholmen, Morten Harket, Paul Waaktaar-Savoy)

Background information
- Origin: Oslo, Norway
- Genres: Synth-pop; new wave; pop rock; pop; alternative rock
- Years active: 1982–1994; 1998–2010; 2011; 2015–present
- Labels: Warner Bros.; WEA; Polydor; RCA
- Spinoffs: Savoy; Apparatjik
- Spinoff of: Bridges
- Members: Morten Harket; Magne Furuholmen; Paul Waaktaar-Savoy
- Website: a-ha.com

A-ha (often stylised as a-ha; Norwegian pronunciation: [ɑˈhɑː]) are a Norwegian synth-pop band formed in Oslo in 1982. Founded by Paul Waaktaar-Savoy (guitars and vocals), Magne Furuholmen (keyboards, guitars and vocals), and Morten Harket (lead vocals), the band rose to fame during the mid-1980s.

A-ha achieved their biggest success with their debut album Hunting High and Low in 1985. The album peaked at number one in their native Norway, number two in the UK, and number 15 on the US Billboard album chart; yielded the international number-one single "Take On Me", as well as "The Sun Always Shines on T.V."; and earned the band a Grammy Award nomination for Best New Artist. In the UK, Hunting High and Low continued its chart success into the following year, becoming one of the best-selling albums of 1986. The band released studio albums in 1986, 1988, and 1990, with single hits including "Hunting High and Low", "The Living Daylights", "Stay on These Roads", and "Crying in the Rain". In 1994, after their fifth studio album, Memorial Beach (1993), failed to achieve the commercial success of their previous albums, the band went on hiatus. Following a performance at the Nobel Peace Prize Concert in 1998, A-ha recorded their sixth album, 2000's Minor Earth Major Sky, which was another number-one album in Norway and Germany. This album was followed by Lifelines (2002); Analogue (2005), which was certified Silver in the UK; and Foot of the Mountain (2009), which was certified Silver in the UK and reached the top five in many European countries.

The band split after their 2010 worldwide Ending on a High Note Tour, but reunited in 2015 to release their tenth studio album, Cast in Steel. They toured in support of the album and participated at Rock in Rio, which celebrated 30 years for both the band and the event.

The band has released eleven studio albums, several compilations and four live albums, with their most recent album, True North, released on 21 October 2022. In less than a year, during 2010, the band earned an estimated 500 million Norwegian kroner from concert tickets, merchandise and the release of a greatest hits album, making them one of the 40–50 highest-grossing bands in the world. The band were listed in the Guinness World Records book for having the biggest-paying rock concert attendance; they drew an audience of 198,000 at Maracanã Stadium during the Rock in Rio 2 festival in 1991. They have sold more than 100 million units, albums and singles combined.

== History ==
=== Formation ===
Original A-ha logo, used from 1985 to 1993 and since 2015.

The trio, composed of lead vocalist Morten Harket; guitarist Paul Waaktaar (then known as Pål Waaktaar); and keyboardist Magne Furuholmen, formed in 1982, and left Norway for London in order to make a career in music. "We were trying to think of what to call themselves, focusing on Norwegian words people could say in English." They jettisoned that idea when Morten spotted a song called "A-ha" in Waaktaar's songbook. "It was a terrible song but a great name," said Morten.

They chose the studio of musician and producer John Ratcliff because it had a Space Invaders machine. He introduced them to his manager, Terry Slater, and after a few meetings, A-ha enlisted both as managers. The two formed TJ Management, with Ratcliff handling technical and musical matters, while Slater handled international business and served as liaison to Warner Bros. head office in Los Angeles.

Early influences on A-ha included the Doors, Joy Division, Echo & the Bunnymen and Ingmar Bergman. Upon arriving in London, the band were "charmed" by the UK's synth-pop scene, drawing inspiration from acts such as Soft Cell, Yazoo and OMD, as well as the more guitar-oriented Aztec Camera.

=== Hunting High and Low (1984–1986) ===
An early version of "Take On Me" was the first song that Harket had heard Furuholmen and Waaktaar play in Asker. At that time, the song was called "Miss Eerie" and the two men were still known as Bridges. Harket said it sounded more like a "Juicy Fruit song" (meaning a gum advertisement). A-ha's first recorded version was called "Lesson One". The song was then re-recorded, renamed "Take on Me", and released in 1984, when it was promoted with a video of the band performing in front of a blue background. After it failed to chart, the song was re-recorded with production by Alan Tarney; it again failed to chart. Finally, the song was re-released in 1985 with a new, groundbreaking video; this time, the song peaked at number one on the US Billboard Hot 100 and at number two on the UK Singles Chart.

A-ha became the first Norwegian band to have a number-one hit in the U.S. The popularity of "Take on Me" earned the band a spot on the American television series Soul Train in 1985, making them one of the few white artists to appear on the black music-oriented show. (Earlier Soul Train appearances by white artists included Gino Vanelli, Elton John, David Bowie, Hall & Oates, Sheena Easton, Pet Shop Boys, Michael McDonald, and Teena Marie.)

The video used a pencil-sketch animation/live-action combination called rotoscoping, in which individual frames of film are drawn over or coloured. It was received to high acclaim in the US, where it was nominated for eight awards at the third annual MTV Video Awards in 1986, winning six, including Best New Artist in a Video, Best Concept Video, Best Direction, Best Special Effects, Viewer's Choice and Best Video of the Year. Their six MTV Award wins for that video gave them more than any artist in the three years of the awards combined.

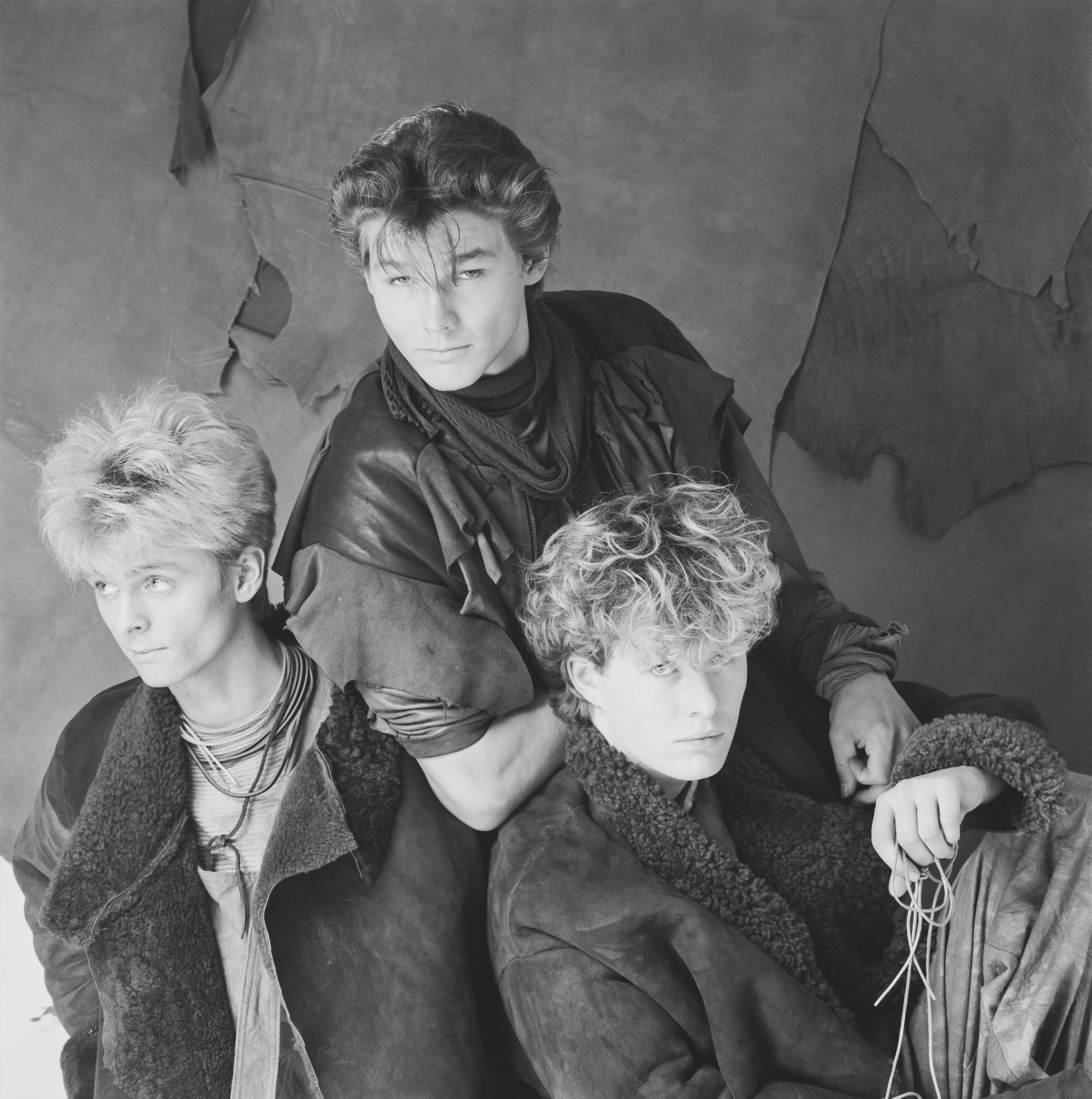
Publicity image of the band in 1984

The band's second single worldwide was "The Sun Always Shines on T.V.", even though "Love Is Reason" was the second single in Norway. In the US, the song peaked at number 20 on the Billboard Hot 100 and reached number 17 on Radio & Records airplay chart. A remix version was a club hit, rising to number five on the Hot Dance Singles Sales chart. The music video for the song was another popular and critical success, nominated at the 1986 MTV Video Music Awards in three categories and winning two, Best Cinematography and Best Editing, bringing A-ha's total to 11 nominations and eight wins. The following year, Peter Gabriel would earn 13 nominations and win nine awards, also for two separate videos. In successive years, even as the award categories expanded, only a few artists have approached—and none have surpassed the single-year award totals of A-ha and Gabriel.

A-ha's American success culminated in their 1986 Grammy nomination in the Best New Artist category, which was eventually won by Sade. "The Sun Always Shines on T.V." turned out to be A-ha's last Hot 100 Top 40 single and to this day – in the United States – A-ha is remembered by the general public almost entirely because of "Take On Me". As such, the band is frequently considered a one-hit wonder there, despite their two Top 40 hits. In the UK, where "The Sun Always Shines on T.V." has been their only number one, A-ha enjoyed continued success with two more hit singles from the same album, "Train of Thought" and "Hunting High and Low" (with another innovative video), and remained popular throughout the 1980s and early 1990s.

The band's first album, 1985's Hunting High and Low, became a worldwide bestseller, spending most of October and November in the top 20 of Billboard's Top 200 album chart. The album and its four hit singles garnered international recognition for A-ha. Hunting High and Low earned triple platinum status in the UK and reached platinum status in the US and Germany, while earning gold in Brazil and the Netherlands. Hunting High and Low has sold 11 million copies worldwide. The album peaked at number 15 on the US on the Billboard 200 albums chart and at number two on the UK Albums Chart; it spent 38 weeks in the top 10 in Norway, including eight weeks at number one.

=== Golden age (1987–1994) ===
A-ha's second album, Scoundrel Days, was released in the midst of the 1986 world tour and represented a move towards alternative rock, as synthpop began to fall out of style. Although the album received favourable reviews and had three singles become international hits, sales (6.4 million copies) did not match those of its predecessor (except for in Switzerland, where it remains A-ha's best-selling album). "Cry Wolf" would be the last A-ha single to chart on the Billboard Hot 100. After the release of the album, A-ha toured in the US, its last appearance there for 20 years. The album has been certified platinum in the UK, Switzerland and Brazil, and has earned gold certification in Germany.

Ned Raggett of AllMusic Guide would later write of the album, "The opening two songs alone make for one of the best one-two opening punches around: the tense edge of the title track, featuring one of Morten Harket's soaring vocals during the chorus and a crisp, pristine punch in the music, and 'The Swing of Things,' a moody, elegant number with a beautiful synth/guitar arrangement (plus some fine drumming courtesy of studio pro Michael Sturgis) and utterly lovelorn lyrical sentiments that balance on the edge of being overheated without quite going over...The '80s may be long gone, but Scoundrel Days makes clear that not everything was bad back then."

In May 1988, A-ha released their third studio album, titled Stay on These Roads, which matched the number-two chart peak of its two predecessors on the British album charts. Stay on These Roads has been certified platinum in Brazil and France, and gold in Switzerland, Germany, the UK and the Netherlands.

The album includes the title-track theme song to the James Bond film The Living Daylights. The version that appears on their album is the original version of the song. The band has said that they are particularly proud of the title track, and all three members contributed to its writing. "Stay on These Roads" and "The Living Daylights" would remain part of their live set throughout the rest of the band's history. After the release of the album, the band went on a 74-city world tour. The album has sold more than 4.2 million copies worldwide.

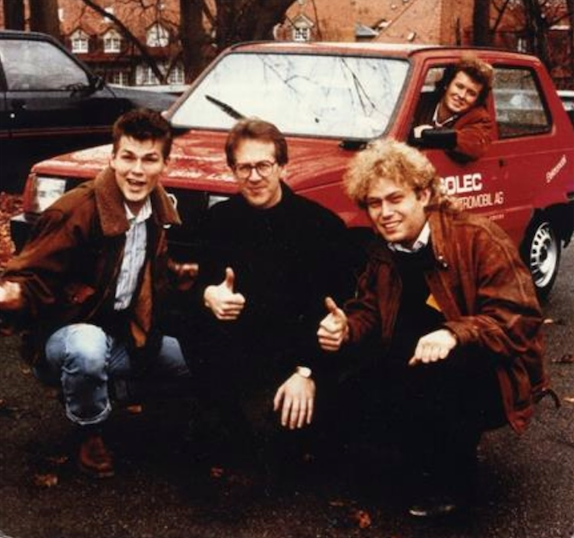
A-ha in 1995

East of the Sun, West of the Moon contained a cover version of The Everly Brothers' 1963 single "Crying in the Rain". In the late 1980s and early 1990s, A-ha were very popular in South America, especially in Brazil, where the band sold out some of the largest stadiums in the world. At the January 1991 Rock in Rio II festival, A-ha shocked the international entertainment press by drawing an audience of 198,000 at Maracanã stadium for their top-billed evening concert—a Guinness World Record for biggest rock concert attendance. In contrast, the other performers (George Michael, Prince and Guns N' Roses) each drew less than a third of that audience (60,000 each). In a 2009 interview from Cody Eide in Music Week, celebrating A-ha's up-and-coming 25-year anniversary, the members revealed that the record-breaking concert and the lack of media attention they received were a devastating blow to the band. The festival, which should have been the band's crowning achievement, was instead a moment of crushing disappointment. "MTV interviewed everybody except us", remembers Waaktaar-Savoy. "They were all calling their bosses and saying, 'We must cover A-ha; it's the only night that has sold out.' But they weren't allowed to." "I felt very alienated," says Furuholmen. "It made us feel hopeless. We played to the biggest crowd in the world and they ignored it."

East of the Sun, West of the Moon was certified gold in Switzerland, Brazil, and Germany and silver in the UK. Steven McDonald of AllMusic said of their fourth album, "This is a nicely crafted collection of songs, performed and sung beautifully, with lots of echoes and suggestions tucked into the music. While not an album one can discuss at length, it's an album that's a pleasure to listen to." The album sold 3.2 million copies worldwide.

Their last album before their hiatus was Memorial Beach, in 1993. Relative to previous releases, the album was a commercial disappointment. The only single from the album to chart officially outside of Norway was "Dark Is the Night", which peaked at number 19 in the United Kingdom. Despite the commercial reception, Q magazine listed the album as one of the 50 best albums of 1993. The following February, A-ha performed two concerts during the 1994 Winter Olympics in Lillehammer, Norway, followed by tours in South Africa and Norway. A-ha were also chosen to compose the official song for the Winter Paralympic Games in Lillehammer, which they entitled "Shapes That Go Together".

In 1994, the band unofficially entered a hiatus, during which band members focused on solo projects.

=== First comeback (1998–2007) ===
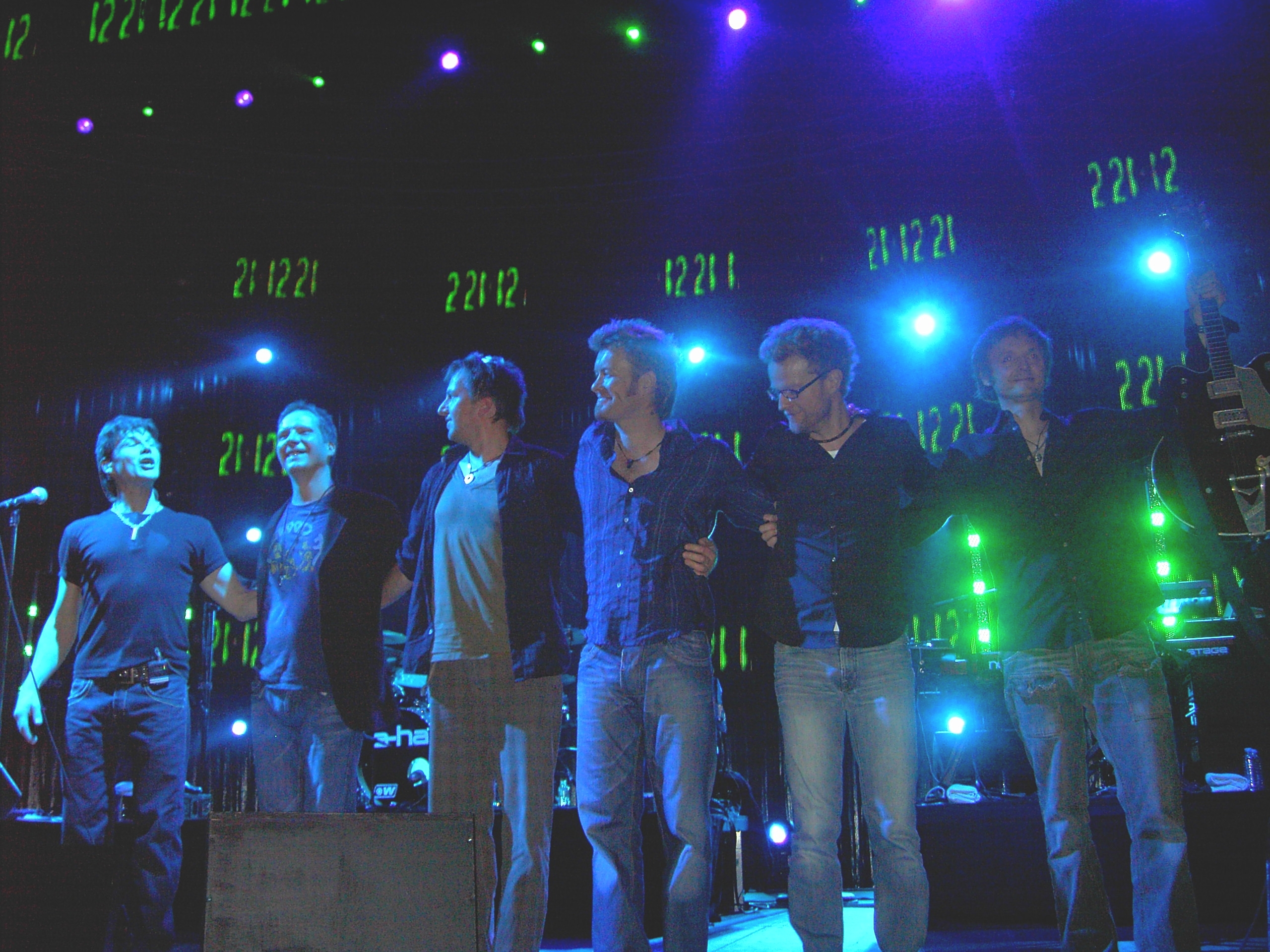
A-ha live at Cologne, 29 October 2005

The band was invited to perform at the Nobel Peace Prize Concert in 1998. Waaktaar-Savoy wrote "Summer Moved On" especially for this performance. They also performed "The Sun Always Shines on T.V." This performance was A-ha's comeback into the world of music, yet the band's set was controversially omitted from a programme of concert highlights that was televised in the UK, and even more controversially in the US by FOX. Nevertheless, the band returned to the studio. Those recording sessions resulted in 2000's Minor Earth Major Sky, an international tour, and a webcast performance of the band opening the new Vallhall Arena in Oslo on 24 and 25 March 2001. A-ha's video for "I Wish I Cared" was one of the first fully web-based animated Macromedia Flash music videos to be made available. (The first was Duran Duran's 2000 video for "Someone Else Not Me".) The album reached platinum status, with sales of 1.5 million copies, and spawned four singles: "Summer Moved On", "Minor Earth Major Sky", "Velvet" and "The Sun Never Shone That Day". "Summer Moved On" went to number one in 17 countries.

A-ha made a return appearance at the Nobel Peace Prize Concert in 2001, performing a new song, "Differences", as well as "Hunting High and Low". The subsequent album, Lifelines, was released in 2002, going platinum in Norway and producing two top-five hits there, "Forever Not Yours" and "Lifelines". Jesper Hiro directed the video for "Lifelines", based on the short film A Year Along the Abandoned Road, which was directed by Morten Skallerud in 1991. The original short film was 12 minutes long; it shows a whole year elapsing in one shot at 50,000 times the normal speed.

A live album from their 2002 tour, titled How Can I Sleep with Your Voice in My Head, was released in March 2003, preceded by a live single of the 1986 hit "The Sun Always Shines on T.V." In 2004, a book entitled The Swing of Things was published, which also included a CD of early demo material titled The Demo Tapes. That year, A-ha celebrated their 20th anniversary with the release of a new singles collection, The Definitive Singles Collection 1984–2004. This compilation brought them back into the top 20 of the UK Albums Chart, where they reached number 13 and earned a gold album.

On 2 July 2005, A-ha performed at the Berlin edition of Live 8 in front of an audience of nearly 200,000 people. They began with "Hunting High and Low", followed by "Take On Me", during which Morten Harket had difficulties hearing himself when his in-ear monitor failed: he requested a two-minute break, which he used to comment on the cause of Live 8. The intended two minutes became almost seven, and the third song, "Summer Moved On", became the last of their set. Although four songs had been rehearsed, the band's time had run out and the organisers told them to leave the stage.

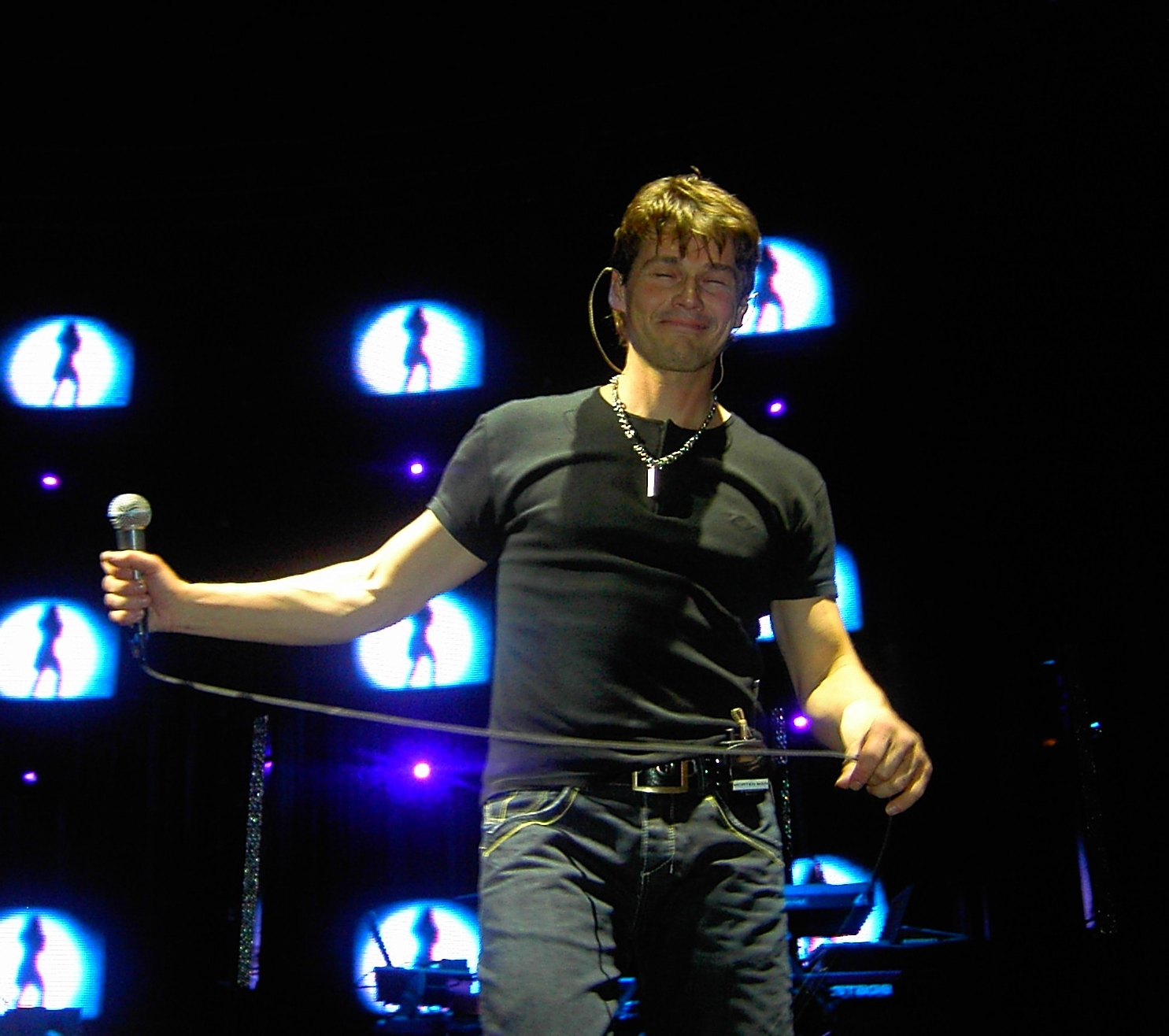
Lead vocalist Morten Harket live at Cologne, 29 October 2005

On 12 September 2005, A-ha played a quickly sold-out show at Irving Plaza in New York City, the band's first concert in North America since 1986, despite not having released any material there since 1993. On 27 August 2005, the band played a concert for 120,000 people in Frogner Park in Oslo, the largest concert ever in Norway.

On 4 November 2005, the band released its eighth studio album, Analogue. The UK release of the single "Analogue" gave A-ha their first top-ten hit in the UK since 1988. The album includes a guest appearance by Graham Nash of Crosby Stills & Nash performing backup vocals on the songs "Over the Treetops" and "Cosy Prisons". The song "Celice" became the band's ninth to reach number one on a major national chart, and its music video sparked criticism for its sexual content. The tour for the album included a gig at London's Shepherd's Bush in February 2006, along with a TV special in Africa.

In 2006, A-ha recorded a cover of John Lennon's "No. 9 Dream" for Amnesty International. It was released in June 2007 on the album Make Some Noise. On 30 October 2006 in London, A-ha received the prestigious Q Magazine Inspiration Award for their long contribution to music and for inspiring many of their younger colleagues in the business. On 15 September 2007, A-ha played a free outdoor concert in Kiel, Germany, performing on a floating stage in the harbour. The concert was streamed live on the internet via MSN.

On 24 January 2009, 25 years after its first release and the 50th anniversary of the official hit list in Norway, A-ha won the Spellemann Award for VG-lista Hit of All Time for "Take On Me".

=== New direction and farewell (2008–2010) ===
On 20–22 May 2008, Harket, Furuholmen and Waaktaar performed concerts in Oslo to promote their respective solo material before coming together as A-ha to play "Train of Thought", "Take On Me", and two new songs, "Riding the Crest" and "Shadowside", which previewed the new A-ha album, Foot of the Mountain. These events led up to their performance at London's Royal Albert Hall on 24 May. On 24 April 2009, A-ha surprised their fan base by releasing their new single, "Foot of the Mountain", premiering that day on Norwegian radio. The single had been completed only the night before. The song is based upon the track "The Longest Night" by Furuholmen, which was released on his album A Dot of Black in the Blue of Your Bliss. The band promoted the German release of the song by playing it during the final of Germany's Next Topmodel on 21 May at Cologne's Lanxess Arena. Foot of the Mountain, A-ha's ninth studio album, was released in Europe on 19 June 2009. The album's material marked a return to synth pop, similar to the band's earliest work, although the first single (and title track) was not wholly indicative of this. The band collaborated with successful producer Steve Osborne, who has produced albums for such artists as Suede, New Order, Starsailor, Doves, Elbow, and U2. "What There Is", an earlier solo track by Furuholmen, was re-recorded for the album.

The album entered the German album chart at number one, the UK album chart at number five and debuted on European Album Sales Chart at number eight. In January 2010, Foot of the Mountain was certified platinum in Germany. "I feel more connected to Depeche Mode (compared with other acts of the '80s)," claimed Furuholmen. A-ha performed a cover of Depeche Mode's "A Question of Lust" during a live performance for BBC Radio 2 – The Dermot O'Leary Show on 25 July 2009. On 24 July 2009, A-ha headlined the iTunes Live festival, the performance of which was made available for download on iTunes. In the Norwegian iTunes Store A-ha's release has yet to see the light of day. On 15 October 2009, the band announced they would disband after the 2010 worldwide Ending on a High Note Tour. The concert sold out on the first day of ticket sales as thousands of fans from at least 40 countries on six continents congregated to see A-ha for the last leg of the tour. Due to the large demand, a second farewell show was held for 3 December 2010.

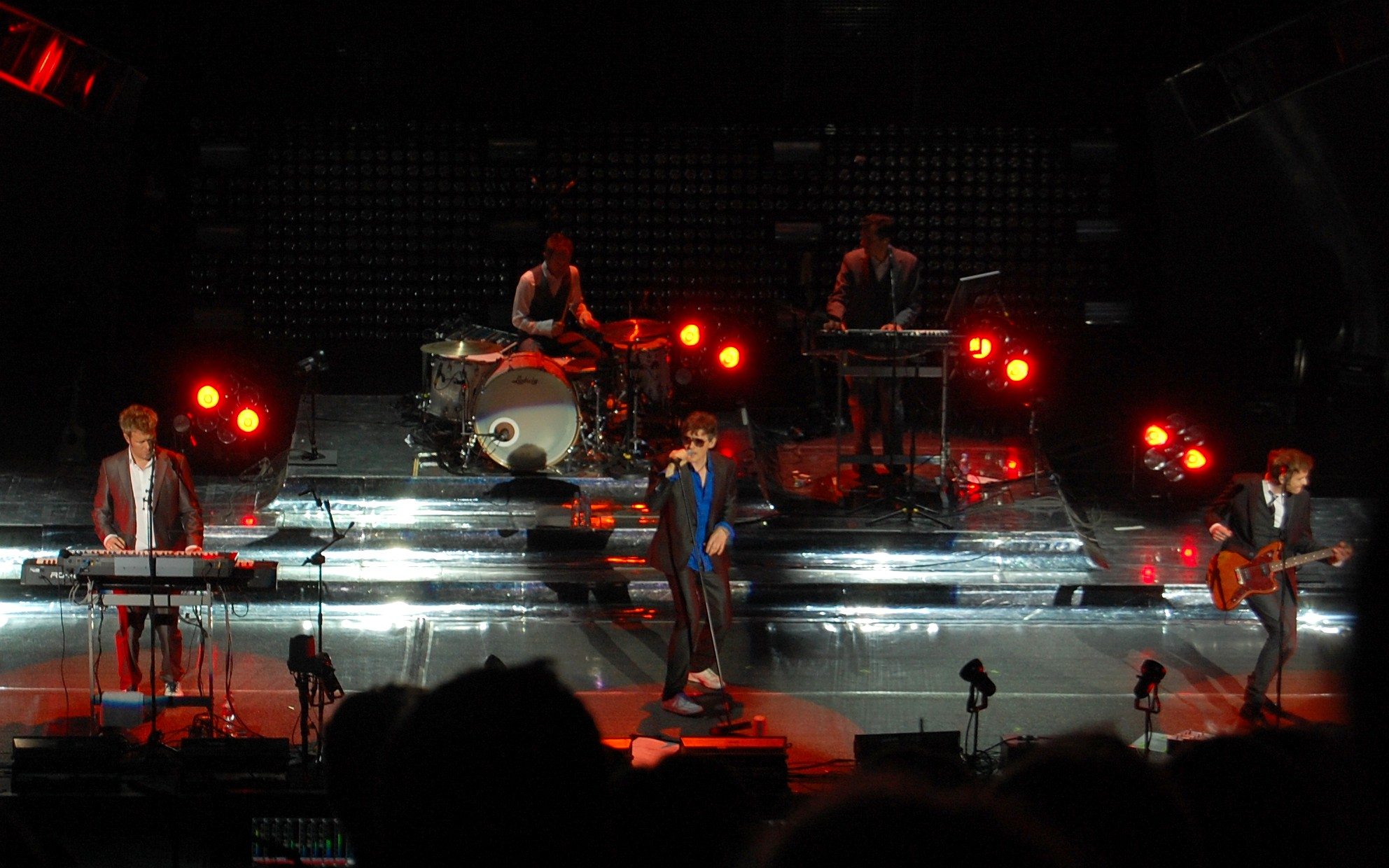
A-ha performing in Glasgow, Scotland, during their Ending On a High Note Tour, 2010

To coincide with their disbandment, A-ha released The Singles: 1984–2004 in the US and re-released deluxe versions of their first two albums, as well as a third and final compilation album, a new live DVD and a re-release of the book The Swing of Things by Jan Omdahl. A new single titled "Butterfly, Butterfly" was revealed on 14 June 2010 and released as a single on 5 July to promote the double CD compilation 25.

On 6 July 2010, the albums Hunting High and Low and Scoundrel Days were released as deluxe editions in the US through Rhino Records, containing remixes, B-sides, demo versions, and extensive liner notes. Available in two-disc CD and digital versions (with additional material), both albums debuted in the Top 40 Billboard Top Internet Sales Chart, Hunting High and Low at number 34 and Scoundrel Days at number 36. Furuholmen revealed in an interview published in Magasinet (the magazine section of Norway's third largest newspaper, Dagbladet) that he suffers from atrial fibrillation. The news was picked up the same day by electronic music magazine Side-Line. At the 2011 Spellemannprisen, Norwegian artists from various music genres including Kaizers Orchestra, Ida Maria and Bertine Zetlitz, performed a cover of "The Sun Always Shines on TV" in honour of the band. After the performance, A-ha received the Honorary Award with the words "Our Heroes – Once upon a time, now – still and forever".

A-ha's final concerts in Oslo were recorded by ten HD cameras with digital, surround sound audio. Ending on a High Note Live, mixed by Toby Alington, is available in several formats, including the band's first Blu-ray release. A single-disc live album comprised sixteen tracks, while the Blu-ray, DVD, and deluxe-edition double-CD set comprised twenty tracks. A bonus documentary appears in the deluxe set and Blu-ray versions. An NTSC version was released in the US and Japan.

On 1 April 2011, A-ha released the DVD as well as the box-set containing both the DVD and the CD of their last concert, Ending on a High Note – The Final Concert. The Blu-ray of the concert was released on 11 April 2011. A-ha played at Oslo Spektrum on 21 August 2011, performing the song "Stay on These Roads" for a national memorial service dedicated to the victims of the 2011 Norway attacks.

=== Post-a-ha activities and anniversary releases (2011–2014) ===
After A-ha's break-up, Harket released two studio albums, Out of My Hands (2012) and Brother (2014).

Waaktaar released two songs. With New Jersey–based vocalist Jimmy Gnecco, he presented Weathervane as a new project in June 2011. Their self-titled single was included on the soundtrack for the movie Headhunters (based on the book Hodejegerne by Jo Nesbø). A second song, "Manmade Lake", had originally been planned for Foot of the Mountain but was released to SoundCloud in 2013.

In 2012, Furuholmen became a mentor on the show The Voice – Norges beste stemme. His mentee, Martin Halla, won the contest and had his first album produced by Furuholmen himself who is also an esteemed songwriter/producer for other artists. In 2014, Furuholmen agreed to compose the songs and supervise the recordings for the Norwegian film Beatles.

=== Second comeback (2015–2016) ===
During an A-ha fan convention in Oslo in October 2014, manager Harald Wilk announced plans to re-release A-ha's first five albums on vinyl and albums three through five as deluxe editions. In 2015, the band reunited to perform in Rock in Rio. A-ha in fact reunited for a two-year period and was writing new material. A-ha's tenth studio album, Cast in Steel, was released on 4 September 2015. The album was promoted with a European tour from March through May 2016. In March, they played a live concert that was broadcast on BBC Red Button and BBC Radio 2 as part of its "In Concert" series.

A-ha also performed at the 2015 Nobel Peace Prize Concert in Oslo, Norway. In Oslo Spektrum on 3 May 2016, A-ha collaborated with Void, a Norwegian computational computational design studio. The project resulted in a concert with advanced scenography using 360 virtual reality technology. The stereoscopic VR experience was made available for Android users directly through a YouTube app and for iPhone users and other platforms. The concept involved several motion detectors that reacted to the band's movements, voices and instruments. 3D cameras, 20,000 lines of code, 1,000 square meters of projection film and massive projectors were set up as a visual show that turned the Spektrum arena in Oslo into a light installation and visual experience that unfolded live for the audience instead of a pre-programmed sequence.

=== MTV Unplugged and tours (2017–2021) ===
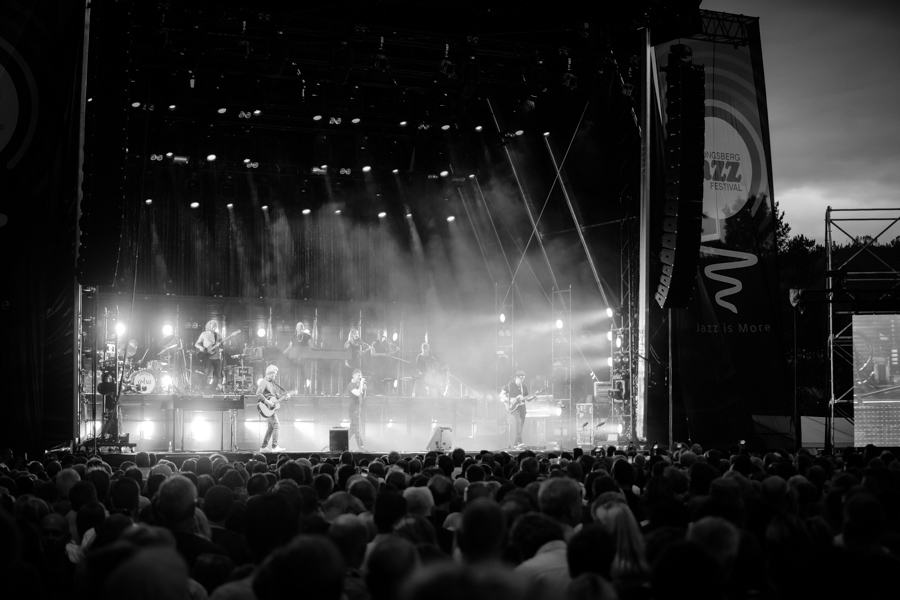
The band performing at the Kongsberg Jazz Festival in 2018

An album and film from a series of acoustic performances, slated for June 2017, was scheduled for November 2017. In mid-June 2017, they recorded an MTV Unplugged special in the remote Norwegian island of Giske under close secrecy, with no phones or recording equipment allowed in the studio. In October 2017, an acoustic album titled Summer Solstice was released. It and included two new songs, "This Is Our Home" and "A Break in the Clouds". The video for "This Is Our Home" was released in September 2017, followed by the Unplugged versions of "The Sun Always Shines on T.V", "The Living Daylights" and "Take On Me", the last of which received widespread acclaim for re-imagining the pop classic. In early 2018, A-ha went on a European acoustic tour, which was first titled "An Acoustic Evening with A-ha" but then renamed "MTV Unplugged Tour 2018".

The acoustic version of "Take On Me" was included in the movie Deadpool 2, released in May 2018, and in episode 13, season 4 of the American TV series The Magicians. On 29 October 2019, A-ha started their Hunting High and Low tour in Dublin, Ireland, in which they played the whole of their debut album, in addition to other songs. The tour, scheduled to run through 2020, was postponed due to the COVID-19 pandemic. Concerts were scheduled for many European countries, South Africa, Japan, Australia, New Zealand, Peru, Chile, Argentina, Brazil, Mexico and the United States. On the tour, the band presented the new song "Digital River".

On 13 June 2021, the documentary A-ha: The Movie premiered at the Tribeca Film Festival in New York. The movie tells the story of the band and deals with both their success and the problems, such as personal rifts between members. Director Thomas Robsahm followed the band for four years. It was released in countries worldwide.

The acoustic studio version of "Take On Me" was included in the American TV sitcom The Goldbergs on episode 16, season 8.

=== Touring and True North (2022–present) ===
In March 2022, A-ha resumed the Hunting High and Low tour after postponements due to the COVID-19 pandemic. A new film and an album, both called True North, were released on 21 October 2022 on the Sony Music/RCA Records label. The recording was completed in November 2021 with the Norwegian Arctic Philharmonic Orchestra in Bodø, Norway. It is a filmed live performance and will also include scenic clips from Norway's nature, set in landscapes of northern Norway. The album's lead single, "I'm In", was released on 8 July 2022.

A-ha performed two of the album's songs on their 2022 tour: "Forest for the Trees" and "You Have What It Takes". A demo of "I'm In" and "You Have What It Takes" was previously posted on social media by Magne. The album's second single, "You Have What It Takes", was released on 16 September 2022. In 2023, in celebration of 65 years of the Hot 100, Billboard staff listed the 500 Best Pop Songs of All Time that graced the chart since 1958, with "Take on Me" at No. 26.

== Legacy ==
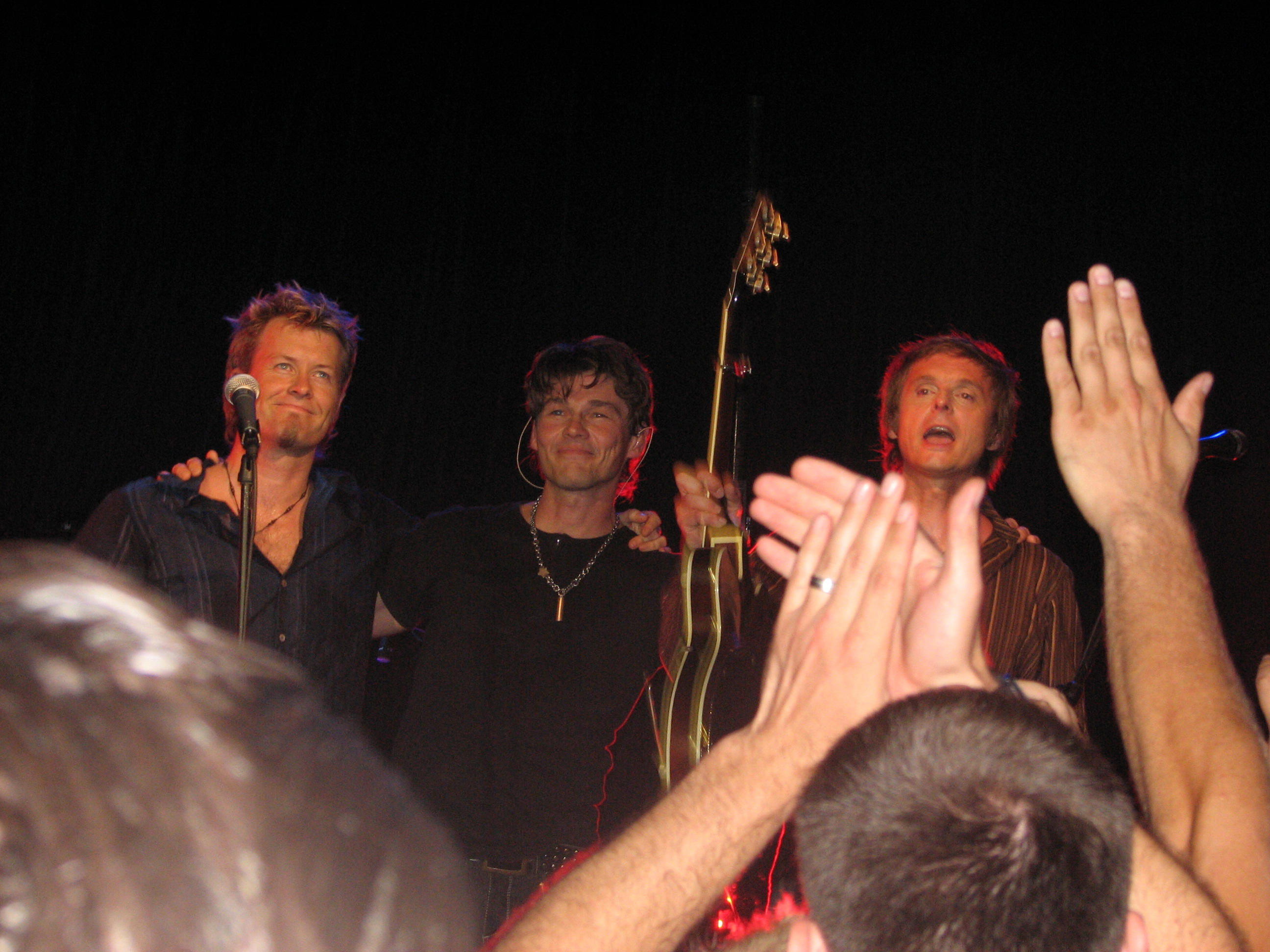
The band in New York City, United States, 2005

To date, the band is the most successful global pop-music act to have emerged from Norway. At its peak in the mid-1980s, the band achieved chart-topping success in Britain and the United States and was commercially successful in non-English-speaking areas of the world such as Germany, France and South America. In 1986, A-ha received eight MTV Video Music Awards during one award show. The music video for "Take On Me" is considered to be one of the most distinctive music videos from the 1980s. On 17 February 2020, the video became the fifth video from the 1980s and 1990s to reach 1 billion views on YouTube, following "November Rain" and "Sweet Child o' Mine" by Guns N' Roses, "Smells Like Teen Spirit" by Nirvana and Queen's "Bohemian Rhapsody".

Songs by A-ha, either in original form or in the form of cover versions, have been included as background music and performances in episodes of popular television series, such as The Last of Us, Baywatch, Melrose Place, South Park, Smallville, Cougar Town, Private Practice and The Leftovers. The band recorded a James Bond theme song, "The Living Daylights", for the film of the same name. A-ha's music has also appeared in movies such as My Best Friend's Exorcism, One Night at McCool's, Grosse Pointe Blank and Corky Romano.

A-ha holds a Guinness World Record from 1991 for drawing the largest paying audience at a pop concert, with 198,000 people at the Estádio do Maracanã stadium in Rio de Janeiro. In 2006, the band was awarded the Q Awards Inspiration Award. Ahead of the 30th anniversary of the Rock in Rio festival in Rio de Janeiro, a poll made it clear that A-ha's 1991 appearance and their record audience number that year was what people remembered best and the highlight of the festival's 30-year history. As a result, A-ha were invited to reunite for a performance at the festival, celebrating 30 years since their debut album's release.

Several bands and artists have mentioned that they like A-ha, including Chris Martin of Coldplay, Sarah Brightman, Adam Clayton of U2, Graham Nash of Crosby, Stills, Nash & Young, and Pitbull. Pitbull and Christina Aguilera performed the song "Feel This Moment", which interpolates "Take On Me", live at the MGM Grand during the 2013 Billboard Music Awards, with a surprise appearance from Harket. Harket and Furuholmen used their celebrity status to pioneer plug-in electric vehicles in Norway when, together with the environmental NGO Bellona, they imported a converted Fiat Panda and managed to get it registered. Their driving around in this car became local folklore and Robbie Andrew, a senior scientist working at Oslo's CICERO Centre for International Climate Research, has argued that the Norwegian enthusiasm for electric cars and their favourable fiscal status can be traced back to this period.

== Awards and nominations ==
Following the success of their debut, the band was nominated for a Grammy Award for Best New Artist in 1986. A-ha have won eight MTV Video Music Awards: six for "Take On Me" and two for "The Sun Always Shines on TV". "Take On Me" was also nominated for Favorite Pop/Rock Video at the American Music Awards of 1986. They also have won nine Spellemann Awards–the Norwegian equivalent of the Grammy Awards–including Spellemann of the Year in 1986.

In November 2012, all three bandmates were appointed Knights of the 1st Class of the Royal Norwegian Order of St. Olav for their contribution to Norwegian music.

== Band members ==
- Magne Furuholmen – keyboards, guitars, backing vocals
- Morten Harket – lead vocals, occasional guitar
- Pål Waaktaar-Savoy – guitars, drum programming, percussion, backing vocals, occasional keyboards

Current touring/session musicians

- Karl-Oluf Wennerberg – drums (2009–present)
- Erik Ljunggren – programming, keyboards, backing vocals, bass (2009–2016, 2019–present)
- Even Ormestad – bass, keybass (2015–present)

== Discography ==
Studio albums

- Hunting High and Low (1985)
- Scoundrel Days (1986)
- Stay on These Roads (1988)
- East of the Sun, West of the Moon (1990)
- Memorial Beach (1993)
- Minor Earth Major Sky (2000)
- Lifelines (2002)
- Analogue (2005)
- Foot of the Mountain (2009)
- Cast in Steel (2015)
- True North (2022)

== Tours ==
- World Tour (1986–1987) (US, Canada, Europe, Australia, Japan)
- Stay on These Roads Tour (1988–1989) (Europe, Japan, South America)
- East of the Sun West of the Moon Tour (1991) (Europe, South America)
- Memorial Beach Tour (1993–1994) (Europe, Lebanon, South Africa, Russia)
- Minor Earth Major Sky Tour (2000–2001) (Japan, Russia, Europe)
- Lifelines Tour (2002–2004) (Europe, Brazil, Russia)
- Analogue Tour (2005–2007) (Europe, Russia, US, Senegal, Chile)
- Foot of the Mountain Tour (2009) (Europe, South America, Japan, Russia)
- Ending on a High Note Tour (2010) (Europe, US, Canada, South America, Japan, Russia)
- Cast in Steel Tour (2015–2016) (South America, Europe, Russia)
- MTV Unplugged Tour (2018) (Europe)
- Electric Summer Tour (2018) (Europe and Israel)
- An Evening with Format – Hunting High and Low Live (2019) (Europe and Russia)
- A-ha Play Hunting High and Low Live (2020–2022) (Australia, Europe, Japan (*), New Zealand, South Africa, United Arab Emirates, Singapore (*), USA, South America and Central America)

(*) Concerts in Japan and Singapore cancelled due to the COVID-19 pandemic.

== See also ==
- Alan Tarney
- Tarney Spencer Band

Awards
| Preceded by Lava | Recipient of the Pop Spellemannprisen; 1985/1986 | Succeeded by Tomboy |
