= List of A-ha band members =

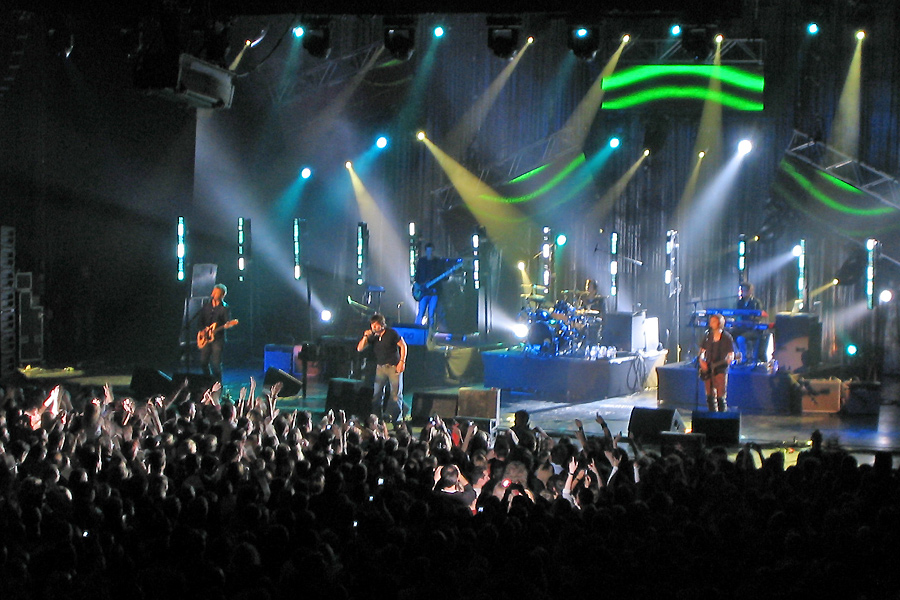
A-ha performing in Frankfurt in 2005. From left: Magne Furuholmen (keys, guitar), Morten Harket (vocals), Sven Lindvall (bass), Per Lindvall (drums), Pal Waaktaar-Savoy (guitar) and Christer Karlsson (keys).

The following is a list of musicians who have toured and or recorded with the Norwegian synth-pop band A-ha, which was founded in Oslo in 1982 by Paul Waaktaar-Savoy (guitars and vocals), Magne Furuholmen (keyboards, guitars and vocals), and Morten Harket (lead vocals). Current touring musicians include drummer Karl-Oluf Wennerberg & programmer/keyboardist Erik Ljunggren (both of whom first joined in 2009) and bassist Even Ormestad (since 2015). Former musicians have included Leif Karsten Johansen, Mike Sturgis, Randy Hope-Taylor, Matthew Letley, Per Hillestad, Per Lindvall and Sven Lindvall.

== Members ==
Image	Name	Years active	Instruments	Release contributions
	Morten Harket	1982–1994; 1998–2010; 2011; 2015–present	lead vocals; occasional guitar	all releases
	Magne Furuholmen	1982–1994; 1998–2010; 2011; 2015–present	keyboards; guitars; bass; backing and occasional lead vocals	all releases
	Pål Waaktaar-Savoy	1982–1994; 1998–2010; 2011; 2015–present	guitars; drums; percussion; backing vocals; keyboards; bass	all releases

== Touring musicians ==
=== Current ===
Image	Name	Years active	Instruments	Release contributions
	Karl-Oluf Wennerberg	2009–2010; 2011; 2015–present	drums; percussion	Foot of the Mountain (2009); Ending on a High Note: The Final Concert (2011); Cast in Steel (2015); MTV Unplugged: Summer Solstice (2017); True North (2022)
	Erik Ljunggren	2009–2010; 2011; 2015–2016; 2019–present	programming; keyboards; backing vocals; bass	Foot of the Mountain (2009); Ending on a High Note: The Final Concert (2011); Cast in Steel (2015); True North (2022)
	Even Ormestad	2015–present	bass; keyboards	Cast in Steel (2015); MTV Unplugged: Summer Solstice (2017); True North (2022)
	Kjetil Bjerkestrand	on occasion	keyboards; orchestration	Minor Earth Major Sky (2000); Foot of the Mountain (2009); True North (2022)

=== Former touring/session musicians ===
Image	Name	Years active	Instruments	Release contributions
	Lindsay Elliott	1985	drums	"Take on Me" music video, Top of the Pops, "The Sun Always Shines on TV" music video
	Gina Schock	1986	drums	US TV appearances on American Bandstand, Soul Train and Solid Gold.
	Mike Sturgis	1986–1987	drums	Scoundrel Days (1986)
	Leif Karsten Johansen	1986–1987	bass; backing vocals	Scoundrel Days (1986)
	Dag Kolsrud	1986–1987	keyboards	none
	Ian Wherry	1988–1989	keyboards	none
	Randy Hope-Taylor	1988–1989	bass	Stay on These Roads (1988)
	Rafael Gayol (aka Danny Gayol)	1988–1989	percussion	none
	Matthew Letley	1988–1989	drums	none
	Per Hillestad	1990–1994	drums	Stay on These Roads (1988); East of the Sun, West of the Moon (1990); Memorial Beach (1993); Minor Earth Major Sky (2000); True North (2022)
	Jørun Bøgeberg	1990–1994	bass; backing vocals	Stay on These Roads (1988); East of the Sun, West of the Moon (1990); Memorial Beach (1993); Minor Earth Major Sky (2000); Lifelines (2002); Analogue (2005)
	Sigurd Køhn	1991–1994	saxophone	none
	Øivind Madsen	1994 (Africa leg of tour)	bass	none
	Sven Lindvall	2000–2007	bass; backing vocals	Minor Earth Major Sky (2000); Lifelines (2002); Analogue (2005); Live at Vallhall: Homecoming (2001); How Can I Sleep with Your Voice in My Head (2003)
	Per Lindvall	2000–2007	drums	Minor Earth Major Sky (2000); Lifelines (2002); Analogue (2005); Cast in Steel (2015); Live at Vallhall: Homecoming (2001); How Can I Sleep with Your Voice in My Head (2003)
	Christer Karlsson	2000–2007	keyboards; backing vocals	Live at Vallhall: Homecoming (2001); How Can I Sleep with Your Voice in My Head (2003)
	Anneli Drecker	2000–2002 (and selected concerts in 2010, 2016, & 2022)	backing vocals; duet partner; tambourine; keyboards	Live at Vallhall: Homecoming (2001); How Can I Sleep with Your Voice in My Head (2003)
	May Kristin Kaspersen	2002 (Russian leg of tour)	backing vocals; duet partner	none
	Jonny Sjo	2006 (substitute)	bass	none
	Tini Flaat Mykland	2016 (selected concerts)	backing vocals	none
	Lars Horntveth	2017–2018	guitars; woodwinds	Cast in Steel (2015); MTV Unplugged: Summer Solstice (2017)
	Morten Qvenild	2017–2018	keyboards	MTV Unplugged: Summer Solstice (2017); True North (2022)
	Madeleine Ossum	2017–2018	violin; backing vocals	MTV Unplugged: Summer Solstice (2017); True North (2022)
	Emilie Heldal Lidsheim	2017–2018	viola; backing vocals	MTV Unplugged: Summer Solstice (2017)
	Tove Margrethe Erikstad	2017–2018	cello; backing vocals	MTV Unplugged: Summer Solstice (2017)

=== Guests ===
Image	Name	Years active	Instruments	Release contributions
	Sondre Lerche	2002	vocals	Lerche performed with the band on "Locust" at the bands reunion concert in 2002.
	Erin Hill	2008	harp	Opening act in 2008 in Europe and London and at Royal Albert Hall.
	Kygo	2015	electronics; synths	Kygo performed with the band at The 2015 Nobel Peace Prize Concert on a remixed version on "Take on Me"
	Ian McCulloch	2017; 2018	vocals	McCulloch sang on two songs, "The Killing Moon" (by his band, Echo & the Bunnymen) and "Scoundrel Days", with the band at both MTV Unplugged concerts at Øygardshallen (Giske Harbour Hall) on the island of Giske in 2017, as well as at the O2 Arena, London in February 2018 on the same songs.
	Alison Moyet	2017	vocals	Moyet performed at the MTV Unplugged concert, on the second show, on "Summer Moved On".
	Lissie	2017	vocals	Lissie guested on “I’ve Been Losing You” at both MTV Unplugged concerts.
	Ingrid Helene Håvik	2017	vocals	Håvik guested on “The Sun Always Shines on TV” at both MTV Unplugged concerts.
	Susanne Sundfør	2018	vocals	Sundfør performed on "I've Been Losing You" and on "The Sun Always Shines on TV" at the Oslo Spektrum in February 2018.

== Line-ups ==
Period	Members	Releases
1982 – 1985	Morten Harket – vocals; Paul Waaktaar – guitar, drum programing, backing vocals; Magne Furuholmen – keyboards, bass programming, backing vocals	Hunting High and Low (1985)
1985	Morten Harket – vocals; Paul Waaktaar – guitar, backing vocals; Magne Furuholmen – keyboards, bass programming, backing vocals; Additional personnel: Lindsey Elliot – drums	"Take On Me" (1985) music video
1986	Morten Harket – vocals; Paul Waaktaar – guitar, backing vocals; Magne Furuholmen – keyboards, bass programming, backing vocals; Additional personnel: Gina Schock – drums	US TV appearances on American Bandstand, Soul Train and Solid Gold.
1986 – 1987	Morten Harket – vocals; Paul Waaktaar – guitar, drum programming, backing vocals; Magne Furuholmen – keyboards, bass and drum programming, backing vocals; Additional personnel: Dag Kolsrud – keyboards; Leif Karsten Johansen – bass, backing vocals; Mike Sturgis – drums	Scoundrel Days (1986)
1988 – 1989	Morten Harket – vocals; Paul Waaktaar – guitar, bass and drum programming, backing vocals; Magne Furuholmen – keyboards, bass and drum programming, backing vocals; Additional personnel: Ian Wherry – keyboards; Randy Hope-Taylor – bass; Matthew Letley – drums; Rafael Gayol – percussion	Stay on These Roads (1988)
1990 – 1991	Morten Harket – vocals; Paul Waaktaar-Savoy – guitar, backing vocals, bass and piano (studio); Magne Furuholmen – keyboards, backing vocals; Additional personnel: Jørun Bøgeberg – bass, backing vocals; Per Hillestad – drums	East of the Sun, West of the Moon (1990)
1991 – 1994	Morten Harket – vocals; Paul Waaktaar-Savoy – guitar, drum programming, backing vocals; Magne Furuholmen – keyboards, backing vocals; Additional personnel: Jørun Bøgeberg – bass, backing vocals; Per Hillestad – drums; Sigurd Køhn – saxophone	Memorial Beach (1993)
Band on hiatus from 1994 – 1998
1998 – 2000	Morten Harket – vocals; Paul Waaktaar-Savoy – guitar, backing vocals; Magne Furuholmen – keyboards, backing vocals; Additional personnel: Sven Lindvall – bass; Per Lindvall – drums	Minor Earth Major Sky (2000)
2000 – 2002	Morten Harket – vocals; Paul Waaktaar-Savoy – guitar, backing vocals; Magne Furuholmen – keyboards, guitar, backing vocals; Additional personnel: Sven Lindvall – bass; Per Lindvall – drums; Christer Karlsson – keyboards, backing vocals; Anneli Drecker – backing vocals	Live at Vallhall: Homecoming (2001); Lifelines (2002); How Can I Sleep with Your Voice in My Head (2003)
2002	Morten Harket – vocals; Paul Waaktaar-Savoy – guitar, backing vocals; Magne Furuholmen – keyboards, guitar, backing vocals; Additional personnel: Christer Karlsson – keyboards, backing vocals; Sven Lindvall – bass; Per Lindvall – drums; May Kristin Kaspersen – backing vocals	
2002 – 2007	Morten Harket – vocals; Paul Waaktaar-Savoy – guitar, keyboards (studio), backing vocals; Magne Furuholmen – keyboards, piano, guitar, backing vocals; Additional personnel: Christer Karlsson – keyboards, backing vocals; Sven Lindvall – bass; Per Lindvall – drums	Analogue (2005)
2008 (An evening with Morten Harket, Savoy and Magne F)	Magen Furuholmen – vocals, keyboards, guitar; Karl Oluf Wennerberg – drums; Dan Sunhordvik – guitar, backing vocals; Jonny Sjo – bass, backing vocals	
2008 (An evening with Morten Harket, Savoy and Magne F)	Paul Waaktaar-Savoy – vocals, guitar; Lauren Savoy – guitar, vocals; Frode Unneland – drums, backing vocals; Jørun Bøgeberg – bass; Preben Grieg-Halvorsen – keyboards; Hågen Rørmark – guitar, backing vocals; Erin Hill – harp, backing vocals	
2008 (An evening with Morten Harket, Savoy and Magne F)	Morten Harket – vocals; Per Lindvall – drums; Kjetil Bjerkestrand – keyboards; Eivind Aarset – guitar; Jonny Sjo – bass	
2009 – 2010, 2011	Morten Harket – vocals; Paul Waaktaar-Savoy – guitar, backing vocals; Magne Furuholmen – keyboards, guitar, backing vocals; Additional personnel: Erik Ljunggren – keyboards, programming, bass, backing vocals; Karl-Oluf Wennerberg – drums	Foot of the Mountain (2009); Ending on a High Note: The Final Concert (2011)
2015 – 2016	Morten Harket – vocals; Paul Waaktaar-Savoy – guitar, backing vocals; Magne Furuholmen – keyboards, guitar, backing vocals; Additional personnel: Erik Ljunggren – keyboards (live), backing vocals; Karl-Oluf Wennerberg – drums; Even Ormestad – bass	Cast in Steel (2015)
2017 – 2018	Morten Harket – vocals; Paul Waaktaar-Savoy – guitar, backing vocals; Magne Furuholmen – keyboards, piano, guitar, backing vocals, flute; Additional personnel: Karl-Oluf Wennerberg – drums, percussion; Even Ormestad – bass; Lars Horntveth – guitars, woodwind; Morten Qvenild – piano, keyboards; Madeleine Ossum – violin, backing vocals; Emilie Heldal Lidsheim – viola, backing vocals; Tove Margrethe Erikstad – cello, backing vocals	MTV Unplugged: Summer Solstice (2018)
2019 – present	Morten Harket – vocals; Paul Waaktaar-Savoy – guitar, backing vocals, keyboards (studio); Magne Furuholmen – keyboards, guitar, backing vocals; Additional personnel: Karl-Oluf Wennerberg – drums, percussion; Even Ormestad – bass; Erik Ljunggren – keyboards (live), programming, backing vocals	True North (2022)

=== Live performance / studio session with Orchestras ===
Image	Name	Years active	live performance / studio session	Release contributions
	Hollywood Bowl Orchestra	2022	Live performance	Live concert at the Hollywood Bowl
	Norwegian Arctic Philharmonic Orchestra	2022	Studio / Live session	Featured on the album True North
	Macedonian Radio Symphony Orchestra	2015	Studio session	Featured on the album Cold As Stone
	Norwegian Radio Orchestra	2011	Live performance	Memorial service
	Oslo Philharmonic Orchestra	2010	Live performance	Only one show at the Royal Albert Hall in London and one show at Oslo Konserthus in Oslo
	Norwegian Radio Orchestra	1998, 2001 and 2015	Live performance	Nobel Peace Price concert
	Oslo Philharmonic Orchestra and Norwegian Radio Orchestra	2001	Studio session	Used on recordings on the A-ha album Minor Earth Major Sky
	London Philharmonic Orchestra	1986	Studio session	On the recording of the music video version of the song Hunting High and Low from the studio album of the same name
