= Minor Earth Major Box =

Box set by A-ha
- Released: 26 February 2001
- Genre: New wave
- Label: WEA Records

Minor Earth Major Box contained the four CD singles

- "Summer Moved On"
- "Minor Earth Major Sky"
- "Velvet"
- "The Sun Never Shone That Day"

All of these singles appeared on the A-ha Album Minor Earth Major Sky

== Summer Moved On ==
- Summer Moved On (Radio Version)
- Summer Moved On (Album Version)
- Barely Hanging On (Album Version)
- Summer Moved On (Remix)

== Minor Earth Major Sky ==
- Minor Earth Major Sky (Niven's Radio Edit)
- Minor Earth Major Sky (Black Dog Mix)
- Minor Earth Major Sky (Millenia Nova Remix)
- Minor Earth Major Sky (Ian Pooleys Deep Mix)
- Minor Earth Major Sky (ATB Club Remix)
- Minor Earth Major Sky (Early Version)
- Minor Earth Major Sky (Album Version)
- Summer Moved On (CD Rom Video Track)

== Velvet ==
- Velvet (Radio Version)
- Velvet (De Phazz Mix)
- Velvet (Millenia Nova Mix)
- Velvet (New York City Mix)
- Velvet (Alabaster Mix)
- Velvet (Stockholm Mix)
- Velvet (Album Version)
- Velvet (CD Rom Video Track)

== The Sun Never Shone That Day ==
- The Sun Never Shone That Day
- Thought That It Was You
- Minor Earth Major Sky (Ian Pooleys Toothache Mix)
- Minor Earth Major Sky (Pumpin' Dolls Club Mix)
- Minor Earth Major Sky (Video)
