= Savoy Songbook Vol. 1 =

Compilation album by Savoy
- Released: August 6, 2007 (Norway)
- Recorded: 1996–2007
- Genre: Rock
- Label: Genepool (UK)/Universal
- Producer: Lauren & Paul Waaktaar-Savoy; Michael Ilbert

Savoy chronology
| Savoy (2004) | Savoy Songbook Vol. 1 (2007) | See the Beauty in Your Drab Hometown (2018) |

Savoy Songbook Vol. 1 is a compilation album from the Norwegian group of the same name, released Monday, August 6, 2007, in Norway. It was released in the UK by Genepool Records on May 12, 2008. Disc 1 contains three all-new tracks and re-recordings of earlier tracks. Disc 2 contains the original versions of past material, though there are two versions of "Star." "Karma Boomerang" was released as a single in April 2007 in Norway as a download and radio cut.

== Track listing ==
=== Disc One ===
- 1. Rain
- 2. Karma Boomerang
- 3. Best Western Beauty
- 4. Star
- 5. Tears From A Stone
- 6. Grind You Down
- 7. Reasons to Stay Indoors
- 8. Whalebone
- 9. Barefoot In A Denim Jacket
- 10. Lackluster Me

=== Disc Two ===
- 1. Velvet
- 2. Man In The Park (single edit)
- 3. End Of The Line
- 4. Star (single edit)
- 5. Daylight's Wasting
- 6. Empty Of Feeling
- 7. Foolish
- 8. Unsound
- 9. Fearlist
- 10. Bottomless Pit
- 11. You Won't Come To The Party
- 12. The Breakers
- 13. You Should Have Told Me
- 14. Face

== Credits ==
- Produced by Michael Ilbert and Savoy
- Mixed by Sylvia Massy, Kale Holmes and Rich Veltrop
- Mastered by George Marino

Savoy are:

- Drums, backing vocals: Frode Unneland
- Guitar, keyboard and vocals: Paul Waaktaar-Savoy
- Rhythm-guitar and vocal by Lauren Savoy

Additional personnel:

- Bass: Jørun Bøgeberg
- Piano on track 7: Rob Schwimmer
- Drums on track 3: Joe Mardin
- Strings on tracks 1 and 10:The Vertavo Quartet
- Violin/viola on track 3: Atle Sponberg/Jon Sønstebø
- Pedal-steel on track 8: Geir Sundstøl
- Strings on track 7 arranged by Joe Mardin
- All songs written by Paul Waaktaar-Savoy and Lauren Savoy.
- Produced by Savoy.

== Charts ==
| Chart (2007) | Peak position |
|---|---|
| Norwegian Albums (VG-lista) | 7 |
