= Frode Unneland =

- Born: Harald Frode Unneland; 14 April 1967 (age 58); Bergen, Hordaland
- Origin: Norway
- Occupation: Musician
- Instrument: Drums
- Labels: Rune Grammofon; EMI Records; Apollon Records
- Member of: Chocolate Overdose; Savoy
- Formerly of: Unge Frusterte Menn; Popium; Evig Din For Alltid
- Website: Frode Unneland on X

Harald Frode Unneland (born 14 April 1967) is a Norwegian musician, drummer and multi-instrumentalist (guitar, bass guitar, keyboards, piano and vocals).

== Career ==
Unneland has been a central figure on the Bergen music scene. He has played in bands Savoy, Chocolate Overdose, Unge Frusterte menn, Popium, and Evig Din For Alltid.

In 2007 BBC Radio 2 chose Popium's timeless pop masterpiece Anchor Down as record of the week. In 2012 he found back to old friends, and now as 'Sergeant Petter & The Buddies' they play old songs again.

== Discography ==
=== Pompel & The Pilts ===
- 1988: Kjellerteipen
- 1989: Leif I Hulen – Live
- 1989: Det Perfekte Menneske, various artists ("Klikk Klakk")
- 1992: Det Ingen Andre Vil Ha (Rec 90)
- 1997: Nesten Alt (Rec 90)

=== Unge Frustrerte Menn ===
- 1991: Slinger Og Snegler mini-CD
- 1995: Doddo Og Unge Frustrerte Menn (Tylden & Co)
- 1996: Sosialantropologi (Lucky Music)
- 1997: Hodet I Sanden (Grappa Music)
- 1998: Øl Og Peanøtter (Grappa Music)
- 2001: Dronningen Av Kalde Føtter (Grappa Music)
- 2002: Solen Titter Frem – De Beste Sangene compilation (Grappa Music)
- 2006: Dans Til Musikken – Tribute To Lasse Myrvold (Reel Noise Records), various artists ("Dødelige Drifter")

=== Chocolate Overdose ===
- 1992: Everybody Likes Chocolate (Warner Elektra Atlantic)
- 1993: Sugar Baby (Warner Elektra Atlantic)
- 1997: Whatever (Bar None)
- 1999: Dingledoodies (Rune Grammofon)

=== Savoy ===
- 1996: Mary Is Coming (Warner Bros. Records)
- 1997: Lackluster Me (EMI Records)
- 1999: Mountains of Time (EMI Records)
- 2001: Reasons To Stay Indoors (EMI Records)
- 2004: Savoy (Eleventeen Records)
- 2007: Savoy Songbook Vol. 1 (Universal Music)
- 2018: See the Beauty in Your Drab Hometown (Drabant Music)
- 2024: Under (Eleventeen Records)

=== Evig Din For Alltid ===
- 2013: Evig Din For Alltid (Apollon Records)
- 2014: Åtte Minutter Fra Solen (Apollon Records)
- 2015: Tilbake Til Byen (Apollon Records)
- 2016: På Tynn Is (Apollon Records)

=== Other projects ===
With a-ha

- 2000: Minor Earth Major Sky (Warner Elektra Atlantic)
- 2005: Analogue (Warner Elektra Atlantic)

With Ephemera

- 2000: Sun (Ephemera Records)

With Sondre Lerche

- 2001: No One's Gonna Come EP (Virgin Records)
- 2001: Sleep on Needles RP (Virgin Records),
- 2001: Faces Down (Virgin Records)

With Popium

- 2001: Popium (Music Network Records)
- 2002: Permanently High (Music Network Records)
- 2002: Beautiful Thing EP (Music Network Records)
- 2004: Camp (Kong Tiki Records)
- 2006: The Miniature Mile (Kong Tiki Records)
- 2007: Anchor Down single from The Miniature Mile

With others

- 1999: Something Is Like Nothing Was (Smalltown Supersound), with Monopot (Powerlunch)
- 2002: You Know Me (Columbia Records), with Paris
- 2012: Sergeant Petter & The Buddies (Vme, It's A Label), with Sergeant Petter & The Buddies
- 2017: Easy Versions, with Daelen (Marte Dæhlen)
