= Mountains of Time =

Studio album by Savoy
- Released: August 23, 1999
- Recorded: 1998–99
- Genre: Rock
- Length: 51:57 (original release); 48:45 (remaster)
- Label: EMI Norsk
- Producer: Lauren & Paul Waaktaar-Savoy

Savoy chronology
Lackluster Me (1997)	Mountains of Time (1999)	Reasons to Stay Indoors (2001)

Mountains of Time is the third album released by the band Savoy. It is the only original Savoy studio album (apart from Mary is Coming) officially released outside of Scandinavia so far, but only in Central and Western Europe. There was a limited edition with a second CD called The Bovarnick Twins, which was an EP of otherwise unavailable bonus tracks. In 2008, the track "Bottomless Pit" was featured in the Moral Orel episode "Sacrifice".

The album was remastered and rereleased on CD and LP in 2017. For this, several tracks were shortened.

== Track listing ==
1. "Man in the Park"
2. "Star"
3. "End of the Line"
4. "Any Other Way"
5. "Grind You Down"
6. "Bottomless Pit"
7. "Mountains"
8. "Ocean Floor"
9. "Everyone"
10. "See What Becomes"
11. "Break It Gently"
12. "Tongue Tied"

Bonus disc

1. "The Bovarnick Twins"
2. "This, That, & The Other" (alternate version)
3. "Feels Good (To Be This Way)"
4. "Rain" (acoustic version)
5. "Foreign Film" (rock version)

== Personnel ==
Savoy

- Pål Waaktaar Savoy: vocals, guitar, keyboards, bass, string scores
- Lauren Savoy: vocals, guitar
- Frode Unneland: drums, vocals

Additional musicians

- Strings: Bjørg Værnes, Atle Sponberg, Sølve Sigerland, Harvey de Souza, Frode Larsen, Henning Båtnes, Elise Båtnes
- Bass on "Star" and "End Of The Line": Jørun Bøgeberg
- Bass and drums on "Man In The Park": Sven Lindvall and Per Lindvall
- Trumpet on "Man In The Park" and "End Of The Line": Lasse Rossing
- Clavichord on "Bottomless Pit": Magne Furuholmen
- Keyboard on "Any Other Way", "Mountains" and "Tongue Tied": Preben Grieg-Halvorsen

== Charts ==
Chart (1999)	Peak position
Norwegian Albums (VG-lista)	1
