= Cold as Stone =

Cold as Stone may refer to:

- "Cold as Stone", a 1993 song by A-ha from Memorial Beach
- "Cold as Stone", a 2011 song by Lady Antebellum from Own the Night
