= Maya Vik =

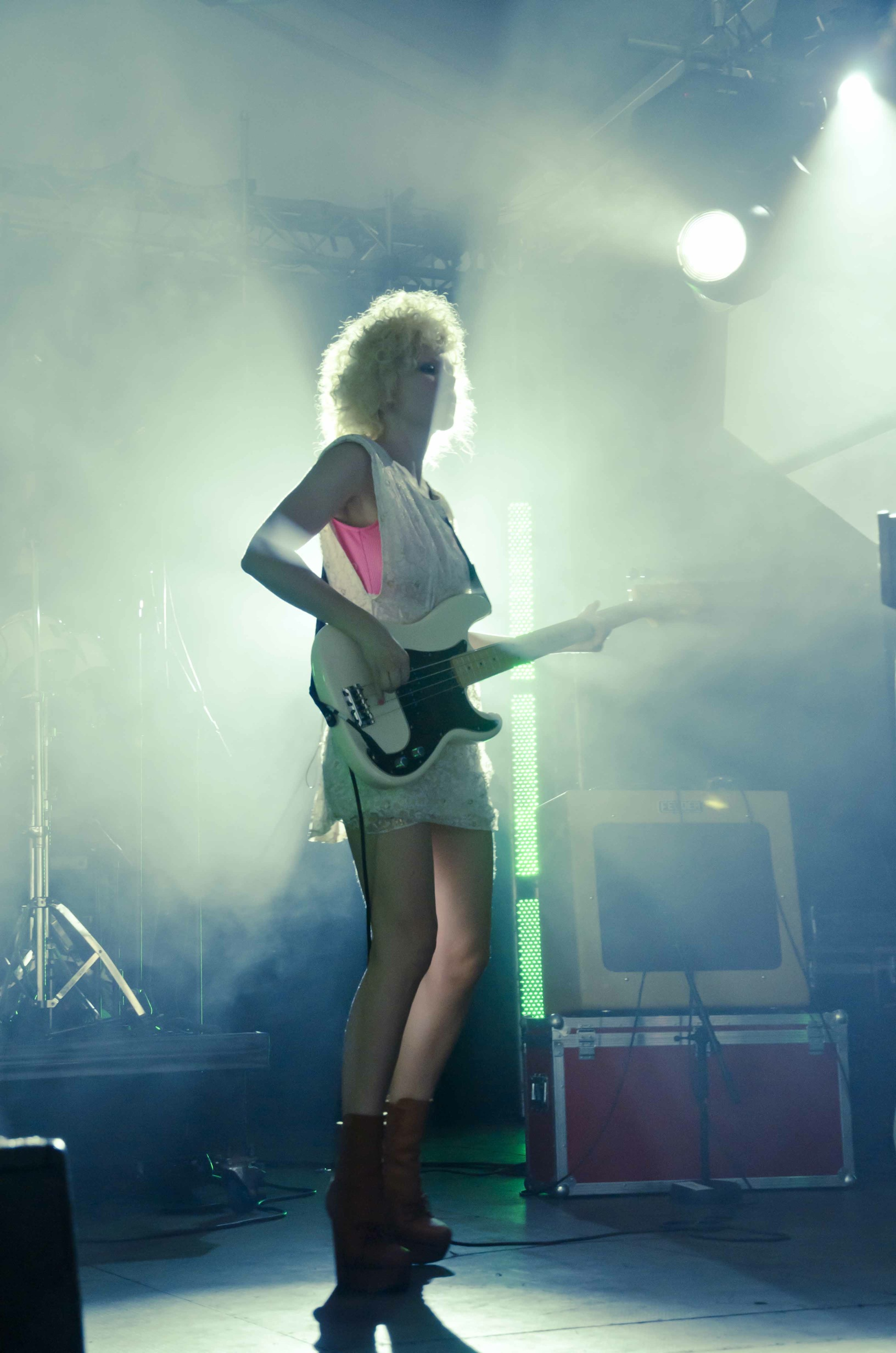
- Maya Vik playing live

Background information
- Born: Maya Vik; Bergen, Norway
- Genre: Funk
- Occupations: Singer-songwriter, bass player
- Instruments: Vocals; bass; keyboards
- Years active: 1999–present
- Labels: EMI, MTG, Oslo Records
- Formerly of: Savoy; Montée
- Website: MayaVik.com

Maya Vik is a Norwegian Grammy (Spellemannprisen) winning singer, songwriter, and bass player from Norway. Her career has spanned over 15 years with music that is often described by the press as reminiscent of the Minneapolis Sound. Most recently, Maya gained notoriety with her Lindstrøm produced homage to Michael Douglas with a song titled "Y.M.D. (Young Michael Douglas)" in which Vice Noisey called a "weird obsession".

== Early years ==
Maya Vik was born into a middle-class family. Her father, Per Kristian Vik is an athlete who specialized in the high jump and won the Norwegian national championship in 1970.

Growing up in Os Municipality, just outside Bergen, Maya bought a guitar when she was 14 and started learning to play. Ultimately, Maya's sister was her biggest influence on music and introduced her to the songs of Janet Jackson, Prince, Michael Jackson, etc. Two years later, Maya switched to playing the bass at age 16.

== Bands ==
=== Furia ===
In 1999 Maya joined Furia, an all-female rock band that formed in Bergen. They released two albums and an EP while signed to EMI Germany. Known throughout Norway, they played many opening gigs for Lenny Kravitz. After the release of the third album, "Piece of Paradise" (produced by Sylvia Massy.), Maya decided it was time to move on.

=== Savoy ===
Fronted by A-ha’s Paul Waaktaar-Savoy, Maya Vik was Savoy's live bass player in 2004 and toured Norway promoting their self-titled album. Maya was also featured in the music video for "Whalebone" which was featured on the soundtrack from the Norwegian film Hawaii, Oslo by Erik Poppe.

=== Montée ===
After Savoy, Maya started Montée, a progressive pop band with two friends, Erlend Mokkelbost and Anders Tjore.

In 2009 Montée released "Isle of Now" featuring the single "Amazona" which won them the "Norwegian Grammy" for Best Pop Group. The second album "Rendition of You" was released on Oslo Records April 2011 featuring singles, "Ghost" (June 2010) and "Faith" (February 2011). "Ghost" was the band's biggest single with 25 weeks on Norwegian radio.

Montée toured mostly in Norway and opened for Raphael Saadiq in Oslo. They also played a few gigs in Germany, UK and in China. Maya officially left Montée in 2012.

== Solo career ==
=== Château Faux-Coupe ===
Maya released her debut solo album Château Faux-Coupe in 2011 while still playing bass with Montée. The album was produced and co-written with Øyvind Holmboe Basmo and Chris Lie and released on Oslo Records. The album was released at the opening of the photo exhibition MV/AV in Oslo and both the album and the exhibition got great reviews. The vinyl release of Château Faux-Coupe contains the photo book from the exhibition which was sponsored by Canon. H&M hosted the exhibition in their flagship store in Oslo featuring a live performance from Maya.

=== Bummer Gun ===
Bummer Gun was recorded in Oslo, Norway. It includes a Proviant Audio remix of "Be for Me", and a Royalty remix of "Every Single Day". The album was produced mostly by Øyvind Holmboe Basmo and Maya Vik with the following exceptions. Title track "Bummer Gun" was produced by Royalty (UK). "Pictures" was produced by Alabama producers Block Beattaz. Morgan Phalen (the singer from bands like Diamond Nights, Justice, and Favored Nations) was a big part on this album, he co-wrote "Bummer Gun", "Be the One", "Be for Me", "Sexy Face", co- produced "Morgan Phalen*", and remixed "Daydreaming". He also sings on "Be the One".

=== Lay Low EP ===
The album started out with a beat that Maya wrote. After creating a melody on top of it, she felt that she could take the song into many different directions. She asked some of her favorite artists at the time, Dawn Richard, Little Pain, Morgan Phalen and Handerre Linni to each interpret the beat in their own way and make their own versions of it. This turned into Lay Low EP. Produced by Maya and mixed by Øyvind Holmboe Basmo. Additional keys by Haakon Marius Pettersen.

=== Beyond the Basics ===
Beyond the Basics includes songs written by Maya Vik over the course of two years from 2013 to 2015. In addition to Maya, several producers came on board for this project including, Øyvind Holmboe Basmo, Proviant Audio, Lindstrøm, William Idap, Pat Lukens, and Nivlac Rextab. Beyond the Basics also includes the track "Y.M.D. (Young Michael Douglas) which Buzzfeed calls "25 Perfect Pop Songs You May Have Already Missed in 2015".

==== YMD Video Game ====
Maya came up with game while sitting around with an animator friend. Together they thought it would be cool to have this video game with Michael Douglas catching pussycats in his mouth. The video game is old school 80s style, taking a nod to the early title like Space Invaders.

== Non-Music Work ==
=== Fashion ===
Although Maya Vik is primarily a musician, she has built a career in fashion over the years and has been featured in several magazines in Scandinavia. In 2009, Elle Magazine in Norway voted her, "Most Beautiful Woman in Norway". She's also been featured on the cover of the Norwegian edition of Cosmopolitan. In 2015, Maya signed to MILK model agency in the UK.

=== Brand Ambassador ===
Maya has been working with different brands and sponsors. Among them are H&M, Acne Studios in Norway, Fender Scandinavia, Canon, Opel, and Mango Time. In 2015, Maya went to Burundi to shoot a campaign for Mango Time who is a supporter of CARE. Money from the sales goes to their work in poor countries in Africa to support women into schools, education and work.

=== Chef ===
Maya Vik also has a strong interest in the culinary arts. In 2014, Maya was featured on a cooking show called 4-stjerners middag halv åtte which aired in Norway. Maya squared off with four other contestants and won. Her winning dishes was Chicken Tagine, Dag Hareef (Israeli fish dish) and an apple crumble. Maya also served homemade hummus and pita bread.

== Discography ==
=== Albums ===
- 2002 – Furia EP, Furia (MTG)
- 2003 – And then we married the world, Furia (MTG)
- 2006 – Piece of paradise (produced by Sylvia Massy), Furia (EMI)
- 2009 – Isle of Now, Montée (EMI)
- 2009 – Chris Lee (Love Ghost, isn't it enough?), Montée (EMI)
- 2011 – Rendition of You (Oslo Records)
- 2011 – Château Faux-Coupe (mixed by Jimmy Douglas), Maya Vik (Oslo Records)
- 2012 – Bummer Gun, Maya Vik (Oslo Records)
- 2014 – Lay Low EP (featuring Dawn Richard, Morgan Phalen, Little Pain and Handerre Linni). (Oslo Records)
- 2014 – Yoguttene (D´sant, 1000 tak), Maya Vik (Oslo Records)
- 2015 – Beyond the Basics (mixed by Jimmy Douglas), Maya Vik (Oslo Records)

=== Singles ===
- 2011 – Oslo Knows (Oslo Records)
- 2012 – On It Kapow (Oslo Records)
- 2014 – Totally Right (Oslo Records)
- 2015 – YMD (Oslo Records)
- 2015 – Fighter (Oslo Records)
