= Angel in the Snow (song) =

Single by A-ha

from the album Memorial Beach
- B-side: "Angel in the Snow" (instrumental)
- Released: 6 September 1993
- Genre: Alternative rock
- Length: 4:13
- Label: Warner Bros.
- Songwriter: Pål Waaktaar

A-ha singles chronology
"Dark Is the Night for All" (1993)	"Angel in the Snow" (1993)	"Lie Down in Darkness" (1993)

"Angel in the Snow" is a song by Norwegian synth-pop band A-ha, released in September 1993 by Warner Bros. as the second single from their fifth studio album, Memorial Beach (1993). The single version of the song is only named "Angel". It was written as a wedding present for Lauren, the wife of principal songwriter and guitarist Paul Waaktaar-Savoy. It is customary at Norwegian weddings that the husband-to-be professes his love for the bride in a personally relevant manner, and "Angel in the Snow" was Paul's contribution. The single reached number 41 on the UK Singles Chart.

== Critical reception ==
Gavin Reeve from Smash Hits gave the song two out of five, writing, "The Scandinavian trio dust off their pop slippers to bring us a lovely little ditty about an angel in the snow. [...] This quietly majestic effort confirms their position as the best band in Norway (beginning with an A)."

== Music video ==
The accompanying music video for "Angel in the Snow" was directed by British director Howard Greenhalgh and produced by Megan Hollister for Why Not Films. It was released on 6 September 1993 and is a time sync film based on yesterday and tomorrow with rewound images.

== Track listing ==
- CD 1
1. "Angel in the Snow" (acoustic instrumental)* – 4:05
2. "Stay on These Roads" – 4:45
3. "Manhattan Skyline" – 4:52
4. "Scoundrel Days" (live) – 4:46
- CD 2
1. "Angel in the Snow" (edit) – 3:45
2. "The Sun Always Shines on T.V." (live) – 4:53
3. "I Call Your Name" (live) – 4:42
4. "Early Morning" (live) – 3:40

* Note: Different from the version found on the "Dark Is the Night" single.

== Charts ==
Chart performance for "Angel in the Snow"
Chart (1993)	Peak position
UK Singles (OCC)	41
