= G-sharp =

G-sharp, G♯ or G# may refer to:

- G-sharp minor, a musical key
- G-sharp major, a musical key
- G♯ (musical note)
- Granville Sharp, an eighteenth-century abolitionist
- G-sharp guitar, designed by Øivin Fjeld
