= Velvet (Savoy song) =

1996 single by Savoy

Single by Savoy

from the album Mary Is Coming
- Released: May 1996
- Recorded: c. 1996
- Genre: Rock
- Length: 4:35
- Label: Warner Bros.
- Songwriters: Lauren Savoy; Paul Waaktaar-Savoy

"Velvet" is a song by Savoy, a band fronted by A-ha's guitarist Paul Waaktaar-Savoy, from their debut studio album, Mary Is Coming (1996). Savoy's version was released as a single in the United States, but received minimal airplay.

== A-ha version ==
"Velvet"

Single by A-ha

from the album Minor Earth Major Sky
- Released: September 2000
- Recorded: 2000
- Genre: Alternative rock; new wave
- Length: 4:01
- Label: WEA
- Songwriters: Lauren Waaktaar-Savoy; Paul Waaktaar-Savoy
- Producers: Boogieman; Roland Spremberg

A-ha singles chronology
"Minor Earth Major Sky" (2000)	"Velvet" (2000)	"The Sun Never Shone That Day" (2000)

A-ha's version of "Velvet" replaced Savoy's guitars with sitars. Their version, which served as the third single from Minor Earth Major Sky, was released to radio stations in Germany (and in other European countries such as Sweden, Switzerland and the Netherlands) in September 2000 and was released to German record stores on 6 November (one week later in other parts of Europe). Originally, "The Sun Never Shone That Day" was to be released in Norway instead of "Velvet", but it was later decided that "Velvet" would also be released in Norway.

The backing vocals were performed by Simone Larsen of the Norwegian band D'Sound.

=== Track listing ===
1. "Velvet" (Radio Version)
2. "Velvet" (De-Phazz Mix)
3. "Velvet" (Millenia Nova Mix)
4. "Velvet" (New York City Mix)
5. "Velvet" (Alabaster Mix)
6. "Velvet" (Stockholm Mix)
7. "Velvet" (Album Version)
8. "Velvet" Bonus Track: Enhanced Video (director's cut - licking version)
- Tracks 1 & 7 mixed by Niven Garland
- Track 2 mixed by Pit Baumgartner
- Track 3 mixed by Millenia Nova
- Track 4 mixed by John Agnello
- Track 5 mixed by Hakan Wollgaard
- Track 6 mixed by Palaar Suna
- Video director Harald Zwart

=== Music video ===
A-ha's music video for "Velvet" portrays the band as murder victims, opening with Morten Harket as a dead man in a bathtub: a girl killed him by electrocution, dropping a plugged hairdryer in the tub. Throughout the video he is taken to the morgue, tagged, etc., all the while singing the lyrics. Paul Waaktaar-Savoy plays his guitar while apparently dead from a gunshot to the head (shot by a girl who looks very similar to the girl who killed Morten), and Magne Furuholmen's body is found in a freezer. All three continue singing and playing while being brought to the morgue, and within it. Some scenes in the morgue controversially suggest necrophilia. The director of this video was Harald Zwart, who also directs Hollywood movies. Zwart, a fellow Norwegian, chose this song to be a part of his new film at the time, One Night at McCool's.

The so-called "licking version" of this video appears on the international DVD release of One Night at McCool's, as well as on the DVD enclosed with the deluxe edition of 25, where it is labeled as "European Cut". The "licking version" got its name because it features the older nurse seen near the end of the video licking Morten's lips instead of kissing him.

=== Charts ===
Chart performance for "Velvet"
Chart (2000)	Peak position
Germany (GfK)	48
Switzerland (Schweizer Hitparade)	92
