= Angel in the Snow =

Angel(s) in the Snow may refer to:

- Angels in the Snow, a 1969 novel by Derek Lambert
- "Angel in the Snow" (song), a song by A-ha on the 1993 album Memorial Beach
- "Angel in the Snow", a song by Elliott Smith from the compilation New Moon
- Angels in the Snow, a 2024 album by Olivia Newton-John

== See also ==
- Snow angel, a design made in fresh snow
