= Briskeby =

Norwegian electropop band

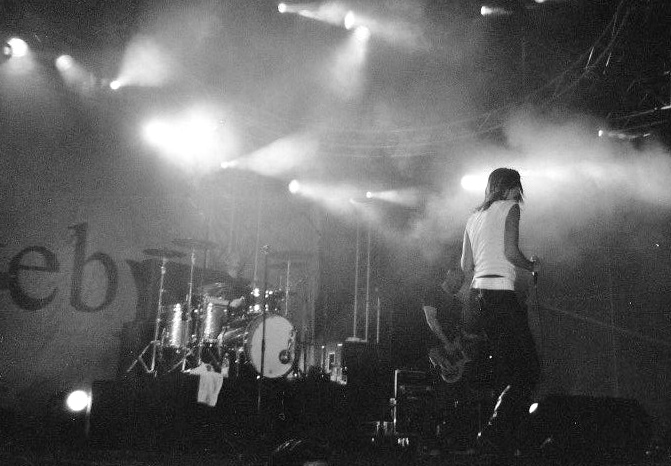
- Briskeby's Lise Karlsnes on stage during the 2001 Roskilde Festival in Denmark.

Background information
- Origin: Larvik, Norway
- Genre: Electropop
- Years active: 1999–2008; 2013–2015
- Label: Warner Music
- Members: Lise Karlsnes; Bjørn Bergene; Claus Heiberg Larsen; Bård Helgeland

Briskeby is an electropop band from Larvik, Norway. Bjørn Bergene, Claus Heiberg Larsen and Bård Helgeland are from Larvik, while Lise Karlsnes is from Tønsberg.

== Biography ==
Their debut album Jeans for Onassis was released in 2000, sold 130,000 copies, gathered four Spellemannprisen and gave Briskeby and their front vocalist Lise Karlsnes, a comet start in the music industry. In 2013 the band gave a series of gigs after five years out of business. The band's name is derived from the neighbourhood where their rehearsal room was located. It received some international attention after it toured as supporting act for A-ha in 2000.

== Band members ==
- Lise Karlsnes (vocals)
- Bjørn Bergene (guitar)
- Claus Heiberg Larsen (drums)
- Bård Helgeland (bass)

== Honors ==
- 2000: Four times Spellemannprisen in the categories best Pop band, this years Artist, Newcomer and Song, for the album Jeans for Onassis and the tune "Propaganda"

== Discography ==
=== Albums ===
- 2000: Jeans for Onassis (Mercury Records)
- 2003: Tonight, Captain? (Universal Music, Mercury Records)
- 2005: Jumping On Cars (Universal Music)

=== Singles ===
- 1999: Song to Whisper (EP)
- 2000: "Propaganda" (single)
- 2001: "Wide Awake" (single)
- 2002: "Hey Harvey" (Norwegian radio single)
- 2002: Cellophane Eyes (Norwegian radio single)
- 2003: Hey Baby (single)
- 2003: Hallelujah (Norwegian radio single)
- 2005: Miss You Like Crazy (single)
- 2005: Joe Dallesandro feat. Ken Stringfellow (Norwegian radio single)
- 2006: Bobby, Come Back (Norwegian radio single)
- 2015: Rookie Mistakes
- 2024: Like The First Time

Awards
Preceded by Savoy	Recipient of the best Pop band Spellemannprisen; 2000	Succeeded by Savoy
Preceded by Lene Marlin	Recipient of the Artist of the year Spellemannprisen; 2000	Succeeded by No Artist of the year award
Preceded by Lene Marlin	Recipient of the Newcomer of the year Spellemannprisen; 2000	Succeeded by Sondre Lerche
