= Minor Earth Major Sky =

2000 studio album by A-ha

Studio album by A-ha
- Released: 14 April 2000
- Recorded: 1998–2000
- Genres: Pop rock; synth-pop; new wave
- Length: 58:42
- Label: WEA
- Producers: A-ha; Kjetil Bjerkestrand; Millenia Nova; Ras; Roland Spremberg; Andre Tanneberger; Pål Waaktaar

A-ha chronology
| Memorial Beach (1993) | Minor Earth Major Sky (2000) | Lifelines (2002) |

Singles from Minor Earth Major Sky
- 1. "Summer Moved On" Released: 25 March 2000; 2. "Minor Earth Major Sky" Released: 10 July 2000; 3. "Velvet" Released: 14 September 2000; 4. "The Sun Never Shone That Day" Released: 21 September 2000

Minor Earth Major Sky (stylised as minor earth | major sky) is the sixth studio album by Norwegian synth-pop band A-ha, released on 14 April 2000 by WEA.

== Background and release ==
Following the release of a-ha's fifth studio album, Memorial Beach (1993), the band decided to go on a hiatus. In 1998, the band was invited to perform at the Nobel Peace Prize Concert. Paul Waaktaar-Savoy had written "Summer Moved On" especially for this performance. They also performed "The Sun Always Shines on T.V.". This performance was a-ha's comeback into the world of music and the band decided to return to the studio.

Almost the entire album was remixed by producer Niven Garland at the record company's insistence to make it more radio-friendly for the band's German market.

"Summer Moved On", "Minor Earth Major Sky" and "Velvet" were commercially released as singles. "I Wish I Cared" was an Internet download single, accompanied by an Internet-only music video—one of the first of its kind.

The aircraft cockpit on the cover art is from a Boeing 707. The image was taken by Bjørn Opsahl at an airplane graveyard in Los Angeles.

Backing vocals for the track "Velvet" were provided by Simone Larsen of Norwegian band D-Sound.

== Reception ==
=== Critical reception ===
Professional ratings
Review scores
| Source | Rating |
|---|---|
| AllMusic | link |
| The Encyclopedia of Popular Music | 3/5 stars |
| Musicfolio | link |

=== Commercial performance ===
Minor Earth Major Sky debuted at number one on the Norwegian Albums Chart, and became the band's first number one album in Germany. The album peaked at number 27 on the UK Albums Chart, but was not released in the U.S. This album was certified platinum in Norway and Germany and gold in Austria, Spain and Switzerland.

== Track listing ==
Standard version
| No. | Title | Writer(s) | Producer(s) | Length |
|---|---|---|---|---|
| 1. | "Minor Earth Major Sky" | Paul Waaktaar-Savoy, Magne Furuholmen | Boogieman, Roland Spremberg, a-ha^{[a]}, Kjetil Bjerkestrand^{[a]} | 5:25 |
| 2. | "Little Black Heart" | Furuholmen, Waaktaar-Savoy | Boogieman, Spremberg, a-ha^{[a]}, Bjerkestrand^{[a]} | 4:35 |
| 3. | "Velvet" | Waaktaar-Savoy, Lauren Savoy | Boogieman, Spremberg, a-ha^{[a]}, Bjerkestrand^{[a]} | 4:21 |
| 4. | "Summer Moved On" | Waaktaar-Savoy | Boogieman, Spremberg, a-ha^{[a]}, Bjerkestrand^{[a]} | 4:38 |
| 5. | "The Sun Never Shone That Day" | Waaktaar-Savoy, Savoy | Boogieman, Spremberg, a-ha^{[a]}, Bjerkestrand^{[a]} | 4:40 |
| 6. | "To Let You Win" | Morten Harket, Håvard Rem | Boogieman, Spremberg, a-ha^{[a]}, Bjerkestrand^{[a]} | 4:24 |
| 7. | "The Company Man" | Furuholmen, Waaktaar-Savoy | Boogieman, Spremberg, a-ha^{[a]}, Bjerkestrand^{[a]} | 3:15 |
| 8. | "Thought That It Was You" | Harket, Ole Sverre-Olsen | Bjerkestrand | 3:50 |
| 9. | "I Wish I Cared" | Furuholmen | Boogieman, Spremberg, a-ha^{[a]}, Bjerkestrand^{[a]} | 4:23 |
| 10. | "Barely Hanging On" | Waaktaar-Savoy | Boogieman, Spremberg, a-ha^{[a]}, Bjerkestrand^{[a]} | 3:56 |
| 11. | "You'll Never Get Over Me" | Waaktaar-Savoy | Boogieman, Spremberg, a-ha^{[a]}, Bjerkestrand^{[a]} | 5:40 |
| 12. | "I Won't Forget Her" | Waaktaar-Savoy | Boogieman | 4:44 |
| 13. | "Mary Ellen Makes the Moment Count" | Waaktaar-Savoy | Waaktaar-Savoy | 4:51 |

Japanese version (bonus track)
| No. | Title | Writer(s) | Producer(s) | Length |
|---|---|---|---|---|
| 14. | "Summer Moved On" (remix) | Waaktaar-Savoy | Boogieman, Spremberg, a-ha^{[a]}, Bjerkestrand^{[a]}, C.L.A.S.S. Production^{[b]} | 6:00 |

Russian version (bonus tracks)
| No. | Title | Writer(s) | Producer(s) | Length |
|---|---|---|---|---|
| 14. | "Minor Earth Major Sky" (Black Dog mix) | Waaktaar-Savoy, Furuholmen | Boogieman, Spremberg, a-ha^{[a]}, Bjerkestrand^{[a]}, R.A.S^{[b]}, Island Brothers^{[b]} | 4:07 |
| 15. | "Velvet" (Stockholm mix) | Waaktaar-Savoy, Savoy | Boogieman, Spremberg, a-ha^{[a]}, Bjerkestrand^{[a]}, Palaar Suna^{[b]} | 4:16 |

2019 deluxe edition (disc two)
| No. | Title | Length |
|---|---|---|
| 1. | "Minor Earth Major Sky" (Early Version) | 5:50 |
| 2. | "Little Black Heart" (Alternate Mix) | 4:35 |
| 3. | "Velvet" (Early Version) | 5:18 |
| 4. | "Summer Moved On" (Early Version) | 4:38 |
| 5. | "The Sun Never Shone That Day" (Early Version) | 4:24 |
| 6. | "To Let You Win" (Early Mix) | 4:39 |
| 7. | "We Will Never Speak Again" (Demo) | 4:19 |
| 8. | "The Company Man" (Early Version) | 4:30 |
| 9. | "Life's Not Fair" (Early Version of "I Wish I Cared") | 3:31 |
| 10. | "Barely Hanging On" (Early Version) | 3:52 |
| 11. | "I Won't Forget Her" (Early Version) | 4:51 |
| 12. | "Manhattan Skyline" (Live - Oslo 2001) | 5:51 |
| 13. | "Thought That It Was You" (Live - Oslo 2001) | 3:45 |
| 14. | "You'll Never Get Over Me" (Live - Oslo 2001) | 6:02 |
| 15. | "Mary Ellen Makes the Moment Count" (Live Oslo - 2001) | 6:06 |
| 16. | "Summer Moved On" (Demo) | 3:34 |

=== Notes ===
- ^{^[a]} signifies a co-producer
- ^{^[b]} signifies a remixer

== Personnel ==
=== A-ha ===
- Morten Harket – vocals
- Magne Furuholmen – keyboards, string arrangements
- Paul Waaktaar-Savoy – guitars, string arrangements

=== Additional musicians ===
- Sven Lindvall – bass (2, 13)
- Jørun Bøgeberg – bass (11)
- Frode Unneland – drums (1, 7)
- Per Lindvall – drums (3, 10, 13)
- Per Hillestad – drums (11)
- Kjetil Bjerkestrand – string arrangements
- Norwegian Radio Orchestra – strings
- Oslo Philharmonic Orchestra – strings
- Vertavo String Quartet – strings (11)
- Simone Eriksrud – vocals (3)
- Lauren Savoy – vocals (11)

=== Technical and design ===
- a-ha – arrangements
- Jon Marius Aareskjold – engineer, Pro Tools operator
- Jan-Erik Kongshaug – engineer
- Ulf Holand – engineer
- Niven Garland – mixing (1, 2, 3, 5, 7–13)
- Andreas Herbig "Boogieman" – mixing (4, 6)
- Kjetil Bjerkestrand – Pro Tools operator
- Magne Furuholmen – art direction
- Kjetil Try – art direction
- Henrik Haugen – logo artwork
- Bjørn Opsahl – photography

== Charts ==
=== Weekly charts ===
Weekly chart performance for Minor Earth Major Sky
| Chart (2000) | Peak position |
|---|---|
| Australian Albums (ARIA) | 169 |
| Austrian Albums (Ö3 Austria) | 4 |
| Belgian Albums (Ultratop Flanders) | 22 |
| Dutch Albums (Album Top 100) | 55 |
| European Albums (Music & Media) | 3 |
| Finnish Albums (Suomen virallinen lista) | 39 |
| French Albums (SNEP) | 41 |
| German Albums (Offizielle Top 100) | 1 |
| Hungarian Albums (MAHASZ) | 7 |
| Irish Albums (IRMA) | 54 |
| Japanese Albums (Oricon) | 53 |
| Norwegian Albums (VG-lista) | 1 |
| Scottish Albums (Official Charts) | 40 |
| Spanish Albums (AFYVE) | 8 |
| Swedish Albums (Sverigetopplistan) | 36 |
| Swiss Albums (Schweizer Hitparade) | 3 |
| UK Albums (Official Charts) | 27 |

=== Year-end charts ===
Year-end chart performance for Minor Earth Major Sky
| Chart (2000) | Position |
|---|---|
| European Albums (Music & Media) | 55 |
| German Albums (Offizielle Top 100) | 15 |
| Swiss Albums (Schweizer Hitparade) | 63 |

== Certifications ==
Certifications for Minor Earth Major Sky
| Region | Certification | Certified units/sales |
|---|---|---|
| Germany (BVMI) | Platinum | 300,000^{^} |
| Spain (Promusicae) | Gold | 50,000^{^} |
| Switzerland (IFPI Switzerland) | Gold | 25,000^{^} |
^{^} Shipments figures based on certification alone.
