= Mary Is Coming =

Studio album by Savoy
- Released: February 27, 1996
- Recorded: 1994–1996
- Genre: Rock
- Length: 48.00
- Label: Warner Bros.
- Producers: Lauren & Paul Waaktaar-Savoy

Savoy chronology
Mary Is Coming (1996)	Lackluster Me (1997)

Mary Is Coming is the debut album released by the band Savoy. It was a different sound from Paul Waaktaar-Savoy's previous band, a-ha, which had gone on hiatus. Savoy aimed to be more guitar-oriented. Mary Is Coming was recorded in Oslo and New York City. The album sold a total of 50,000 copies in Norway and went Gold. Sales in most other countries were unspectacular, leaving Savoy without a worldwide deal. The A&R from Warner that signed the band as a spinoff of a-ha had also left the label and a lack of support from them led Savoy to later sign with EMI in Norway. "Velvet" was re-recorded by a-ha on their 2000 comeback album Minor Earth Major Sky.

== Track listing ==
1. "Daylight's Wasting" – 3:00
2. "Tears from a Stone" – 4:41
3. "Velvet" – 4:38
4. "Foolish" – 4:39
5. "Half an Hour's Worth" – 3:15
6. "Underground" – 3:54
7. "Get Up Now" – 5:21
8. "Still I'm on Your Side" – 4:07
9. "We Will Never Forget" – 3:13
10. "Raise Your Sleepy Head" – 3:31
11. "Mary Is Coming" – 4:42
12. "Fade" – 2:50
13. "October" (B-side of "Velvet") – 3:45

== Personnel ==
- Guitars, bass, vocals, keyboards, programming, arrangements: Paul Waaktaar-Savoy.
- Rhythm guitars and backing vocals: Lauren Savoy.
- Drums and backing vocals: Frode Unneland.
- Backing vocals on "Velvet": Simone Larsen.
- All songs written by Paul Waaktaar-Savoy & Lauren Savoy.
- Produced by: Savoy.
- Released by: WEA International Inc. (outside the US).

== Charts ==
Chart (1996)	Peak position
Norwegian Albums (VG-lista)	1
