= Savoy (Savoy album) =

Studio album by Savoy
- Released: October 30, 2004
- Recorded: 2003–04
- Genre: Rock
- Label: Eleventeen/Sonet
- Producer: Lauren & Paul Waaktaar-Savoy

Savoy chronology
Reasons to Stay Indoors (2001)	Savoy (2004)	Savoy Songbook Vol. 1 (2007)

Savoy is the fifth album from the Norwegian group of the same name, released October 30, 2004, in Norway. Like their two previous releases, there was a regular edition and limited edition. However, this time, the limited edition bonus CD has been substituted by a DVD containing the video for "Isotope". The song "Whalebone" appears in the critically acclaimed film Hawaii, Oslo.

== Track listing ==
All songs written by Paul Waaktaar-Savoy and Lauren Savoy.

1. "Empty of Feeling"
2. "Girl One"
3. "Bovine"
4. "Whalebone"
5. "Shooting Spree"
6. "Melanie Lied to Me"
7. "Watertowers"
8. "Is My Confidence Reeling?"
9. "Rain on Your Parade"
10. "Cyna"
11. "The Breakers"
12. "Isotope"

== Personnel ==
- Paul Waaktaar-Savoy – lead vocals, guitars, bass, keyboards, programming, arrangements
- Lauren Savoy – lead vocals, rhythm guitar, backing vocals
- Frode Unneland – drums, backing vocals
- Jimmy Gnecco - backing vocals on Shooting Spree, lead vocals on The Breakers
- Frode Jacobsen - production on Empty of Feeling, Whalebone, Shooting Spree og Rain On Your Parade, rhythm guitar on Rain On Your Parade
- Geir Sundstøl - pedal steel on Whalebone and Rain On Your Parade
- Jørun Bøgeberg - bass on Shooting Spree, Melanie Lied to Me, Rain On Your Parade and The Breakers
- Sølvguttene - vocals on Shooting Spree
- Hågen Rørmark - harmonica on Is My Confidence Reeling?
- Robert Burås - guitar on Rain On Your Parade
- Per Lindvall - drums on The Breakers
- Timothy Roven - violin on The Breakers
- James Roven - cello on The Breakers
- George Tanderø - recording engineer
- Mike Hartung - recording engineer
- John Agnello - mix on Empty of Feeling, Girl One, Melanie Lied to Me, Shooting Spree and Is My Confidence Reeling?
- Rod Hui - mix on Bovine, Watertowers and Cyna
- Michael Brauer - mix on Whalebone and Rain On Your Parade
- Michael Ilbert - miksing on The Breakers
- Head - miksing on Isotope
- Vlado Meller - mastering
- Joe Lambert - mastering

== Charts ==
Chart (2004)	Peak position
Norwegian Albums (VG-lista)	7
