= Reasons to Stay Indoors =

Studio album by Savoy
- Released: October 8, 2001
- Recorded: 2000–01
- Genre: Rock
- Length: 73 min. (total of both discs)
- Label: EMI Norsk
- Producer: Lauren & Paul Waaktaar-Savoy; Michael Ilbert

Savoy chronology
Mountains of Time (1999)	Reasons to Stay Indoors (2001)	Savoy (2004)

Reasons to Stay Indoors is the fourth album from the Norwegian group Savoy, released Monday, October 8, 2001 in Norway and on February 25, 2002, in Sweden. As with Mountains of Time, a limited edition was released that included a CD bonus with five otherwise unavailable bonus tracks.

== Track listing ==
1. "Reasons to Stay Indoors"
2. "You Won't Come to the Party"
3. "Face"
4. "Half of the Time"
5. "Once Upon a Year"
6. "Fearlist"
7. "I Wouldn't Change a Thing"
8. "Paramount"
9. "The One That Got Away"
10. "Against the Sun"
11. "Five Million Years"
12. "Overgrown"

=== Bonus disc ===
1. "You Should Have Told Me" (alternate version)
2. "I Wouldn't Change a Thing" (alternate version)
3. "Totally Hide"
4. "Once Upon a Year" (alternate version)
5. "D.A.R.

== Personnel ==
- Lead vocals, guitars, bass, keyboards, programming, arrangements: Paul Waaktaar-Savoy
- Lead vocals on Disc 1; 2, 6, 8, 10, 12 and Disc 2; 3, rhythm guitar, backing vocals: Lauren Savoy
- Drums, backing vocals: Frode Unneland

All songs written by Paul Waaktaar-Savoy and Lauren Savoy. Produced by Savoy and Michael Ilbert.

== Charts ==
Chart (2001)	Peak position
Norwegian Albums (VG-lista)	8
