= Minor Earth Major Sky (song) =

2000 single by A-ha

Single by A-ha

from the album Minor Earth Major Sky
- Released: 10 July 2000
- Recorded: 2000
- Genre: New wave
- Length: 5:24
- Label: WEA
- Songwriters: Magne Furuholmen; Paul Waaktaar-Savoy
- Producers: Boogieman; Roland Spremberg

A-ha singles chronology
"Summer Moved On" (2000)	"Minor Earth Major Sky" (2000)	"Velvet" (2000)

Music video
- "Minor Earth Major Sky" on YouTube

"Minor Earth Major Sky" is a song by Norwegian synth-pop band A-ha, released as the second single from their sixth studio album of the same name (2000). The single was serviced to European radio stations around 5 June 2000 and was released commercially in Norway and Germany on 10 July.

== Music video ==
The music video for "Minor Earth Major Sky" was directed by Philipp Stölzl and filmed in an abandoned mine near Plzeň, Czech Republic. In the video, the three band members portray astronauts in a Moon landing. Morten Harket goes off by himself, leaving the others waiting for him; when he returns, he finds they've already launched the lunar module without him. The theme of the video is based on reality; Paul and Magne often complained that Morten would be late to every meeting and concert and interview. In this video, they thought it would be fun to leave him behind.

The suits worn by A-ha in the video were reproductions of real lunar suits; they had been originally used in the 1995 film Apollo 13.

== Track listings ==
- German CD maxi single
1. "Minor Earth Major Sky" (Niven's Radio Edit) – 4:02
2. "Minor Earth Major Sky" (Black Dog Mix) – 4:07
3. "Minor Earth Major Sky" (Millenia Nova Remix) – 4:29
4. "Minor Earth Major Sky" (Ian Pooley's Deep Mix) – 6:16
5. "Minor Earth Major Sky" (ATB Club Remix) – 5:47
6. "Minor Earth Major Sky" (Early Version) – 5:10
7. "Minor Earth Major Sky" (Album Version) – 5:24
- German 12-inch single

A1. "Minor Earth Major Sky" (Ian Pooley's Deep Mix) – 6:16
A2. "Minor Earth Major Sky" (Ian Pooley's Toothache Mix) – 6:59
B1. "Minor Earth Major Sky" (ATB Club Remix) – 5:47
B2. "Minor Earth Major Sky" (Pumpin' Dolls Club Mix) – 8:08

== Charts ==
Chart performance for "Minor Earth Major Sky"
Chart (2000)	Peak position
Germany (GfK)	73
Switzerland (Schweizer Hitparade)	73
