= Memorial Beach =

Studio album by A-ha
- Released: 14 June 1993
- Recorded: 1991–1993
- Studios: Paisley Park, Chanhassen, Minnesota, US
- Genres: Alternative rock; pop rock
- Length: 49:33
- Label: Warner Bros.
- Producers: David Z; A-ha

A-ha chronology
East of the Sun, West of the Moon (1990)	Memorial Beach (1993)	Minor Earth Major Sky (2000)

Singles from Memorial Beach
- 1. "Dark Is the Night" Released: 24 May 1993; 2. "Angel in the Snow" Released: 6 September 1993

Professional ratings
Review scores
Source	Rating
AllMusic	2/5 stars
The Encyclopedia of Popular Music	2/5 stars
Music Week	3/5 stars
Q	4/5 stars
Smash Hits	2/5 stars

Memorial Beach is the fifth studio album by Norwegian synth-pop band A-ha, released on 14 June 1993 by Warner Bros. Records.

== Background ==
The album was recorded primarily in the United States at Prince's Paisley Park Studios outside Minneapolis. Memorial Beach featured three UK Top 50 singles for the band, "Move to Memphis" (released as a single in 1991, almost two years before the album), "Dark is the Night for all" and "Angel in the Snow". While the album did not chart on the U.S. Billboard 200 and would be the band's last to be released there, the single "Dark Is the Night" peaked at #11 on the Billboard Bubbling Under Hot 100 Singles chart, their last U.S. charting to date. Q magazine listed the album as one of the 50 best albums of 1993: "If ever a band deserved reappraisal on the back of an album then it was a-ha!"

"Angel in the Snow" was written by Pål Waaktaar for his bride, Lauren, as a wedding gift. Recording the album was, according to Morten Harket, "A rather dark and heavy period for the band", despite this, Magne Furuholmen has said, "I dig Memorial Beach, and 'Dark is the Night for All' is the high point, the best thing on the disc."

JD and Jevetta Steele from the American gospel group The Steeles contribute backing vocals on the songs "Move to Memphis" and "Lie Down in Darkness". French actress Béatrice Dalle appears in the music video for the song "Move to Memphis".

Some lyrics from "Locust" were reused on Savoy's (Waaktaar's other band) 2004 single "Whalebone".

The album front cover, back cover and booklet includes pictures of the band taken at a photo shoot at Atalaia Beach, in Aracaju, Brazil, during the band's 1991 tour.

This was the last album to feature the original a-ha logo until they reunited for the second time for Cast in Steel (2015).

== Track listing ==
All tracks are written by Pål Waaktaar, except where noted.

No.	Title	Writer(s)	Length
1.	"Dark Is the Night for All"		3:46
2.	"Move to Memphis"	Waaktaar; Magne Furuholmen	4:15
3.	"Cold as Stone"		8:19
4.	"Angel in the Snow"		4:13
5.	"Locust"		5:09
6.	"Lie Down in Darkness"		4:32
7.	"How Sweet It Was"		6:00
8.	"Lamb to the Slaughter"	Furuholmen	4:20
9.	"Between Your Mama and Yourself"		4:16
10.	"Memorial Beach"		4:36

== Personnel ==
=== a-ha ===
- Morten Harket – lead vocals
- Magne Furuholmen – keyboards, backing vocals
- Pål Waaktaar – guitars, drum programming, backing vocals

=== Additional Musicians ===
- Jørun B. Bøgeberg – bass guitar
- Per Hillestad – drums
- J.D. Steele – backing vocals (2,6)
- Jevetta Steele – backing vocals (2,6)
- Kathy Wilson – backing vocals (2,6)

=== Production ===
- A-ha – producers
- David Z – producer, engineer
- David Friedlander – engineer
- Sverre Henriksen – engineer
- Brian Poer – engineer
- Jamie Staub – engineer
- Djinji Brown – second engineer
- Mike Cyr – second engineer
- Derek Davis – second engineer
- Derek Duffy – second engineer
- Robert Opsahl-Engen – second engineer
- Eivind Skovdahl – second engineer
- Rod Hui – mixing
- Pål Waaktaar – mixing
- Ted Jensen – mastering at Sterling Sound (New York City, NY)
- Lyn Bradley – art direction, design
- Jeri Heiden – art direction, design
- Per Fronth – original artwork
- Just Loomis – photography
- Terry Slater – management

== Charts ==
Chart performance for Memorial Beach
Chart (1993)	Peak position
Australian Albums (ARIA)	132
Brazilian Albums (NOPEM)	9
European Albums (Music & Media)	25
French Albums (SNEP)	25
German Albums (Offizielle Top 100)	17
Japanese Albums (Oricon)	27
Norwegian Albums (VG-lista)	1
Swedish Albums (Sverigetopplistan)	39
Swiss Albums (Schweizer Hitparade)	39
UK Albums (Official Charts)	17
