= The Sun Always Shines on T.V. =

1985 single by a-ha

- Artwork for original single

Single by a-ha

from the album Hunting High and Low
- B-side: "Driftwood"
- Released: November 1985 (US); 16 December 1985 (UK)
- Recorded: 1985
- Genre: Synth-pop; new wave
- Length: 4:45 (single version); 5:07 (album version); 7:09 (extended version); 8:25 (dance mix); 6:38 (instrumental version)
- Label: Warner Bros.
- Songwriter: Pål Waaktaar
- Producer: Alan Tarney

A-ha singles chronology
"Love Is Reason" (1985)	"The Sun Always Shines on T.V." (1985)	"Train of Thought" (1986)

2003 re-release singles chronology
"Did Anyone Approach You?" (2002)	"The Sun Always Shines on T.V. a-ha Live" (2003)	"Celice" (2005)

Music video
- "The Sun Always Shines on T.V." on YouTube

"The Sun Always Shines on T.V." is a song by the Norwegian synth-pop band a-ha, released as the third single from their debut studio album, Hunting High and Low (1985). The song was written by guitarist Pål Waaktaar.

In some commercial markets, the single was not as popular as their previous (debut) single "Take On Me", which had reached the top spot in the US and several other countries around the world; however, in the UK and Ireland it improved upon the number-two charting of "Take On Me", reaching number one on the UK Singles Chart for two weeks in January 1986, having been released there on 16 December 1985. Its success secured for the band the prestige of having number-one single status on both primary Anglo-American popular music charts on either side of the Atlantic.

"The Sun Always Shines on T.V." was re-released by the band as a live version in 2003 with some minor success in Eastern Europe. It has sold over five million copies worldwide. Norwegian Eurodance duo Diva had a successful top-10 hit in Norway with their dance version of the song in 1994, which also charted in the UK one year later.

== Writing and recording ==
Band member Paul Waaktaar-Savoy explained:

... we wrote "The Sun Always Shines on T.V.", that Andrew Wickham's secretary felt was a hit. She convinced him to make room for it. When we recorded it, we were really sick with influenza. Magne and Morten were lying in the studio on camping beds with high fevers.

The bassline for the song was performed using a Yamaha DX7. Other synthesizers include PPG Wave, Roland Juno-60 and sampled instruments. The oboe during the song was played on a sampler.

== Release ==
"The Sun Always Shines on T.V." was released in autumn 1985, becoming the second successful single from Hunting High and Low and one of the band's most recognisable and popular songs. The single reached number one in Ireland and on the UK Singles Chart which was a higher chart position there than for "Take On Me". It also went Top 5 in Germany, Sweden, and the Netherlands, as well as in the band's home country of Norway. The song peaked at number 20 in the US on the Billboard Hot 100 chart.

The song received a remix by Steve Thompson and Mike Barbiero, which Billboard described as somewhere between Dead or Alive and Bronski Beat, but more polished than either." There are two versions of the extended mix. The first UK release has a duration of 7:09 and starts with a slow piano intro while the second version opens with a percussion groove.

== Critical reception ==
In their review of the single, Billboard magazine described "The Sun Always Shines on T.V." as a "fuller-sounding followup" to "Take on Me" and that the song's "weighty synths envelop ethereal vocals." Cashbox called it a "smooth second showing" from A-ha with "much of the same melodic vitality" as "Take on Me" with a "strong percussive edge" that they believed resulted in a "more rhythmically powerful cut than its popular predecessor".

Tim DiGravina of AllMusic determined:

"The Sun Always Shines on T.V." is just as thrilling [as "Take on Me"]. Starting as a sad ballad, it explodes into something much more, as chugging guitars and operatic synths keep pace with Harket's evocative vocal stylings. If ever a 1980s song qualified as Wall of Sound, "The Sun Always Shines on T.V." would be it."

== Music video ==
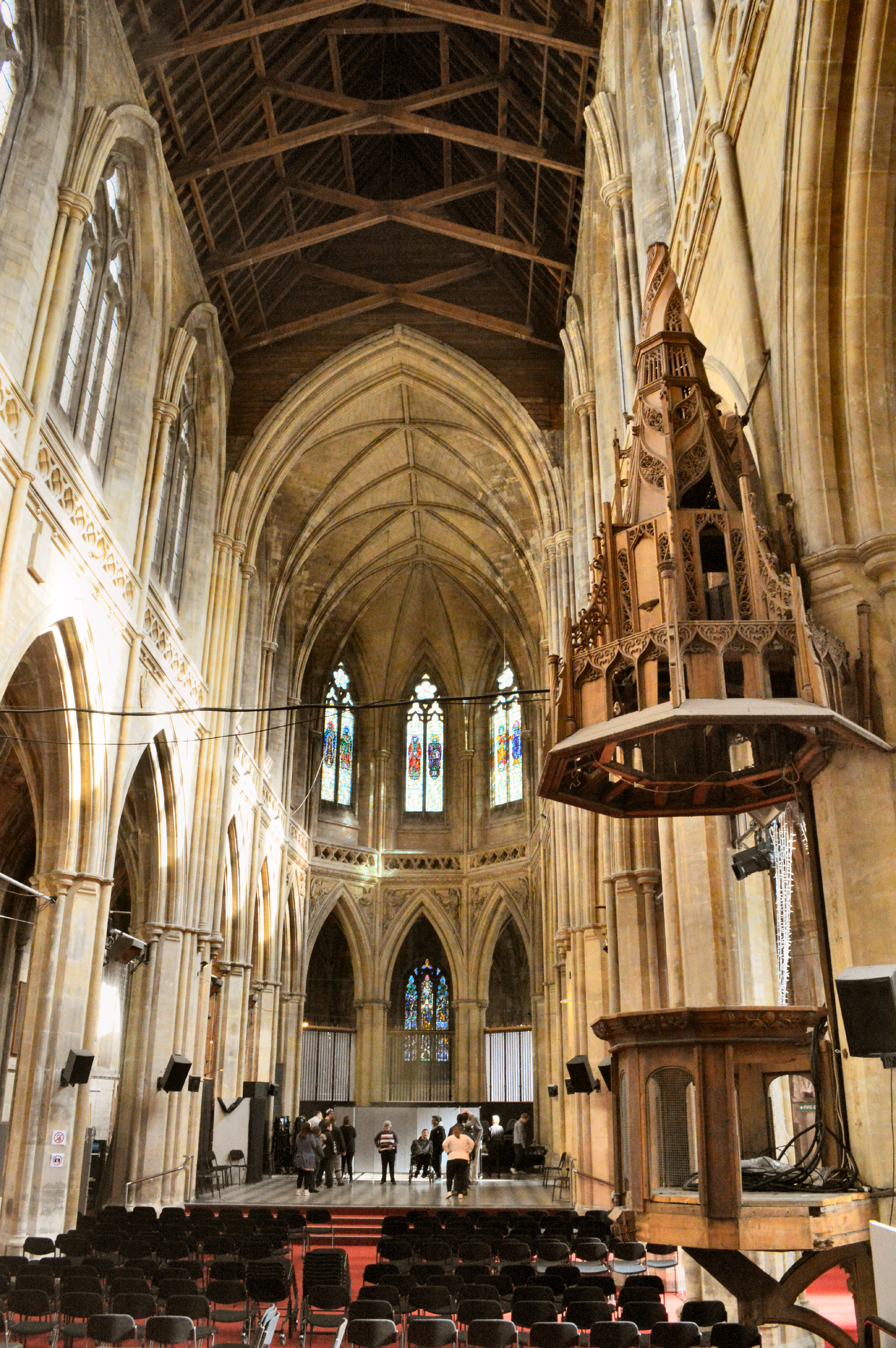
The Victorian Gothic St Alban's Church, Teddington

The music video for "The Sun Always Shines on T.V." was directed by Steve Barron and produced by Simon Fields of Limelight Productions. It was shot on location over three days early October 1985 at Udney Hall Gardens and the Victorian Gothic Church of Saint Alban the Martyr, both situated in Teddington, Richmond upon Thames, in England.

The video opens with a short sequence which forms an epilogue to the video for "Take On Me", the band's previous single, continuing with the use of rotoscoped animation. The young lovers (played by Morten Harket and Bunty Bailey), having survived the ordeal of the story in the first video, now face one another in the woods at night. Suddenly the young man begins physically reverting to his original animated state seen in the "Take On Me" video. The young woman, distressed, realizes that he cannot remain in her world. In pain, he flees the scene into the distance back to his comic-book world, and she is left behind. The camera rises away from her and closing credits roll in the style of the end of a Hollywood classic film, stating "The End / A Warner Bros. First National Picture", followed by an animated television graphic which reads "you are watching channel 3" and the a-ha logo.

The main sequence of the video consists of a-ha performing "The Sun Always Shines on T.V.", supplemented by session drummer Lindsay Elliott, and a bass player, inside a Gothic church, filmed mainly in black-and-white with splashes of pastel coloring. Spectating at the performance is a dense crowd throughout the church of mannequins, most of them bare but some clothed in formal concert dress holding musical instruments to represent the song's classical instrumentation arrangement. The video ends with a-ha being cut out from the background and becoming a still frame.

The music video for the band's next single, "Train of Thought", would pick up from this cue shot, making a visual and story trilogy of "Take On Me", "The Sun Always Shines on T.V." and itself.

=== Awards ===
At the 1986 MTV Video Music Awards, the video won in the categories Best Editing in a Video (editor: David Yardley) and Best Cinematography in a Video (director of photography: Oliver Stapleton). It also received a nomination for Best Art Direction in a Video (art director: Stefan Roman).

== Notable live performances ==
a-ha performed the song at the Nobel Peace Prize concert in 1998 alongside the new song "Summer Moved On".

A live version of "The Sun Always Shines on T.V." was the only single released from the 2003 a-ha album How Can I Sleep with Your Voice in My Head; the music video for it was directed by Pal Waaktaar's wife Lauren Savoy.

In 2017, a-ha appeared on the television series MTV Unplugged and played and recorded acoustic versions of many of their popular songs for the album MTV Unplugged – Summer Solstice in Giske, Norway, including "The Sun Always Shines on TV" (featuring Ingrid Helene Håvik).

== Influences ==
U2 stated that "The Sun Always Shines on T.V." heavily influenced the composition of their 2000 single release "Beautiful Day". Bono paid tribute to it by combining the two songs together at a concert in Oslo, Norway, in 2005. In 2022, Morten Harket said of the similarity between the two songs "that's fine".

The creators of It's Always Sunny in Philadelphia have stated that the name of their show is an indirect reference to this song. Co-creator Glenn Howerton came up with the title It's Always Sunny on T.V. for their original home movie about three vain actors in Los Angeles after listening to Hunting High and Low at the gym. The home movie later evolved into a television pilot with the now-familiar title when the characters were turned into pub owners in Philadelphia.

== Track listings ==
- 7-inch single: Warner Bros. / W 8846 United Kingdom
1. "The Sun Always Shines on T.V." (7″ mix a.k.a. video version) – 4:45
2. "Driftwood" – 3:04
- 12-inch single: Warner Bros. / W 8846T United Kingdom
1. "The Sun Always Shines on T.V." (U.S. Steve Thompson dance mix) – 8:25
2. "Driftwood" – 3:04
- 12-inch single: Warner Bros. / W 8846(T) United Kingdom
1. "The Sun Always Shines on T.V." (extended version) – 7:09
2. "Driftwood" – 3:04
- 7-inch single: Warner Bros. / 9 28846-7 United States
1. "The Sun Always Shines on T.V." (7″ mix a.k.a. video version) – 4:45
2. "Driftwood" – 3:04
- 12-inch single: Warner Bros. / 20410-0 United States
1. "The Sun Always Shines on T.V." (U.S. Steve Thompson dance mix) – 8:25
2. "The Sun Always Shines on T.V." (instrumental) – 6:38
3. "Driftwood" – 3:04

== Charts ==
=== Weekly charts ===
Weekly chart performance for "The Sun Always Shines on T.V."
Chart (1985–1986)	Peak position
Australia (Kent Music Report)	19
Austria (Ö3 Austria Top 40)	8
Belgium (Ultratop 50 Flanders)	5
Canada Top Singles (RPM)	11
Denmark (IFPI)	2
Europe (European Hot 100 Singles)	5
Europe (European Airplay Top 50)	1
Finland (Suomen virallinen lista)	5
France (SNEP)	10
Ireland (IRMA)	1
Italy (Musica e dischi)	9
Netherlands (Dutch Top 40)	5
Netherlands (Single Top 100)	4
New Zealand (Recorded Music NZ)	12
Norway (VG-lista)	2
Quebec (ADISQ)	8
South Africa (Springbok Radio)	8
Sweden (Sverigetopplistan)	2
Switzerland (Schweizer Hitparade)	7
UK Singles (Official Charts)	1
US Billboard Hot 100	20
US Dance Club Songs (Billboard)	6
US Dance Singles Sales (Billboard)	5
US Cash Box Top 100	24
West Germany (GfK)	5

Weekly chart performance for "The Sun Always Shines on T.V." (live)
Chart (2003)	Peak position
Hungary (Single Top 40)	9

=== Year-end charts ===
Year-end chart performance for "The Sun Always Shines on T.V."
Chart (1986)	Position
Belgium (Ultratop 50 Flanders)	41
Canada Top Singles (RPM)	95
Europe (European Hot 100 Singles)	15
France (IFOP)	48
Netherlands (Dutch Top 40)	49
Netherlands (Single Top 100)	71
South Africa (SA Singles Charts)	51
UK Singles (OCC)	21
US 12-inch Singles Sales (Billboard)	49
West Germany (Media Control)	39

== Certifications ==
Certifications for "The Sun Always Shines on T.V."
Region	Certification	Certified units/sales
France (SNEP)	Silver	250,000^{*}
United Kingdom (BPI)	Silver	250,000^{^}
^{*} Sales figures based on certification alone.^{^} Shipments figures based on certification alone.

== Diva version ==
"The Sun Always Shines on T.V."

Single by Diva

from the album Compromise
- Released: 1994
- Genre: Europop
- Length: 4:58
- Label: PolyGram
- Songwriter: Paul Waaktaar-Savoy
- Producers: Ole Evenrud; G. O. Bøkestad

Diva singles chronology
"The Sun Always Shines on T.V." (1994)	"Stand and Deliver" (1995)

Music video
- "The Sun Always Shines on T.V." on YouTube

Norwegian Eurodance duo Diva, consisting of singers Helene Sommer and Elene Nyborg, released their version of "The Sun Always Shines on T.V." in 1994 as their debut single. It was produced by Ole Evenrud and G. O. Bøkestad, reaching number nine on the Norwegian singles chart VG-lista and number four on the Norwegian radio chart Ti i skuddet. In 1995, it peaked at numbers 53 and 14 on the UK Singles Chart and the UK Dance Singles Chart. And in Israel, it became a top-10 hit, peaking at number seven. The accompanying music video was directed by Lauren Savoy, wife of Paul Waaktaar-Savoy of A-ha. It was banned by Norwegian Broadcasting Corporation NRK; they found the video too controversial. A new video was later produced for the UK version. The 1995 version of the song received remixes from the Perfecto crew (Paul Oakenfold and Steve Osborne).

=== Critical reception ===
Upon the 1994 release, a reviewer from Music & Media commented, "What happened to Morton Harket's voice? Suddenly you notice it's a girlie cover of the A-ha hit. The vocal arrangements might be similar, but the duo/dance context makes the difference." British magazine Music Week rated the 1995 version three out of five, adding, "This clubby cover and remix of A-ha's 1985 hit (huge in the duo's native Norway) could well take off here. Pure and peachy Europop." Music Week editor Alan Jones wrote, "Perfecto continues its chart charge with an unlikely remake [...]. You could be forgiven for expecting a storming vocal, but Diva's sweet and soft vocal quality works very well with the muscular, bass-driven Perfecto mixes." James Hamilton from the magazine's RM Dance Update described it as a "breathily cooed and sighed remake" in his weekly dance column. DJ Jon Pleased Wimmin reviewed the song for Muzik and gave it a score of four out of five, declaring it as "a big pop smash for the summer."

=== Track listings ===
- CD maxi-single
1. "The Sun Always Shines on TV" (Radio Edit) – 4:58
2. "The Sun Always Shines on TV" (Long Version) – 6:15
- CD maxi-single (remix)
1. "The Sun Always Shines on TV" (Remix) – 4:58
2. "The Sun Always Shines on TV" (Club Mix) – 6:15
3. "The Sun Always Shines on TV" (Original Mix) – 4:58

=== Charts ===
Chart performance for "The Sun Always Shines on T.V."
Chart (1994–1995)	Peak position
Australia (ARIA)	135
Israel (Israeli Singles Chart)	7
Norway (VG-lista)	9
Norway (Ti i skuddet)	4
Scottish Singles Sales (Official Charts)	44
UK Singles (Official Charts)	53
UK Dance (Official Charts)	14
UK Pop Tip Club Chart (Music Week)	27

== Other cover versions ==
- Interactive covered the track in a single released in 1996.
- In 2003, Milk Inc. released a cover of the song which charted at No. 2 in the Belgian Dance Chart.
- In Strict Confidence covered the song in a single release in 2005.
- Norwegian metal band Susperia included a cover on their 2005 EP Devil May Care.
- German metal band Atrocity included a cover on their 2008 cover album Werk 80 II.
- Canadian drone metal band Nadja covered the song on their 2009 cover album When I See the Sun Always Shines on T.V..
- Danish metal band Meridian released a cover in June 2020 from their EP Taking Cover.
- Norwegian band Keiino released a cover of the song in April 2023 as a single.

== See also ==
- It's Always Sunny in Philadelphia, a television series named after this song
