= Paul Waaktaar-Savoy =

Norwegian musician and songwriter (born 1961)

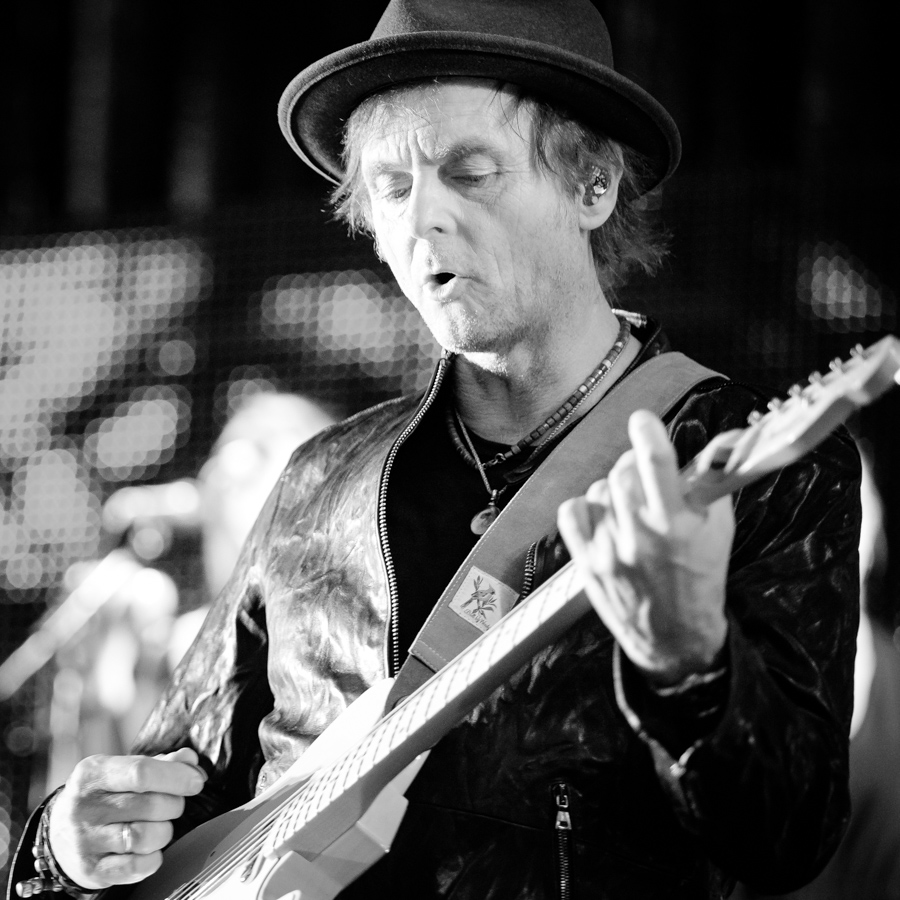
- Waaktaar-Savoy performing in 2018

Background information
- Born: Pål Gamst; 6 September 1961 (age 65); Tonsenhagen, Norway
- Genres: Synth-pop; new wave; alternative rock
- Occupations: Musician; songwriter; singer
- Instruments: Guitar; vocals
- Years active: 1976–present
- Member of: a-ha; Savoy
- Formerly of: Bridges
- Spouse: Lauren Savoy (m. 1991)

Paul Waaktaar-Savoy (born Pål Gamst, 6 September 1961) is a Norwegian musician and songwriter. He is best known for his work as the main songwriter and guitarist in the Norwegian synth-pop band a-ha, which has sold more than 50 million albums worldwide. He has written or co-written most of the band's biggest hits, including "The Sun Always Shines on T.V.", "Hunting High and Low", "Take On Me", the 1987 James Bond theme "The Living Daylights" and the ballad "Summer Moved On". In addition, he is also a painter.

Waaktaar-Savoy was named a Knight First Class of the Order of St. Olav by King Harald for his services to Norwegian music and his international success.

== Early life ==
Waaktaar-Savoy was born to the Gamst family on 6 September 1961 in Tonsenhagen, Norway, at the outskirts of Oslo, and was raised in Oslo's Manglerud district with his older sister Tonje. His birth name is Pål Gamst; in the Norwegian language, an acceptable alternate spelling of his first name is Paal. His father was a pharmacist, and his mother worked at the phone company. He is a distant relative of Norwegian footballer Morten Gamst Pedersen.

His parents appreciated classical music, and encouraged young Pål first to learn the flute, then to study music composition when his performance skill revealed him to be a child prodigy. He admired the music of American rock guitarist Jimi Hendrix and hoped one day to write a rock opera similar to Hair. He used his mother's family name, Waaktaar, in his stage name, to become Pål Waaktaar. He also enjoyed reading and painting. He was a loner, not social at school, and was unsuccessful attracting girlfriends in his teens.

== Music career ==
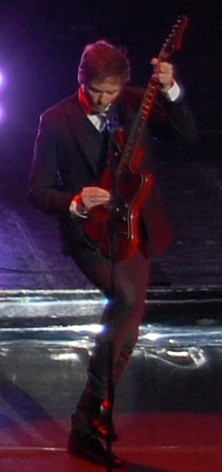
Waaktaar-Savoy in Glasgow 2010

=== Bridges ===
Pål Waaktaar, as he was then known, was lead singer, guitarist and songwriter in the Norwegian rock band Bridges, along with keyboardist Magne Furuholmen (with whom he later formed a-ha with singer Morten Harket), drummers Erik Hagelien and Øystein Jevanord, and bassist Viggo Bondi. In 1980, Bridges released their first album, the self-financed LP Fakkeltog. Although the title is Norwegian (meaning torchlight procession), the songs are in English. At the request of Harket, a-ha performed the Fakkeltog song "The Vacant" (renamed "Sox of the Fox") during their 2017 MTV Unplugged performance, released as MTV Unplugged – Summer Solstice.

An unreleased Bridges song called "Miss Eerie" later evolved into "Lesson One" and then into the a-ha hit "Take On Me".

In 2018, Bridges' second album, Våkenatt ("Wakeful Night"), was released. The album was recorded in late 1980 and early 1981, but was discarded after Paul and Magne Furuholmen decided to go to London, which made Viggo Bondi and Øystein Jevanord to leave the group.

=== a-ha ===
Waaktaar-Savoy is the lead guitarist and main songwriter for a-ha, one of the most successful bands of the 1980s. Once "Q Magazine" named him as one of the best unknown lyricists of his generation. a-ha performed "Summer Moved On" live at the Nobel-Peace-Prize-Concert following a hiatus. After this, they decided to record a new album and, in 2000, a-ha had the comeback of the year, followed by a sold-out tour. The a-ha album "Lifelines" was released in 2002. The following tour was documented in a-ha's second official live album, How Can I Sleep with Your Voice in My Head, which was released in March 2003.

In 2005, the compilation album The Singles: 1984-2004 was released, their last album with WEA. After that, a-ha signed to Universal. Analogue was released later that year. The title-track entered the UK-charts at No. 10. The band's ninth studio album, Foot of the Mountain was released in 2009. After that they split, but in 2015 reunited again and released a new studio album, Cast in Steel.

Waaktaar-Savoy has said "Morten is totally different from me. When we first came to London together, he burned all my clothes and re-dressed me from head to toe. I don't care much about clothes, whereas he's always very interested in them. He has given me self-confidence, encourages me to talk to people, not to be afraid and to use the abilities I have. Morten is actually the only one in Norway who had as much ambition as I did. I guess we both have big egos. In a way, we're each sitting in our own little world, while Mags is more down to earth. Mags often has to mediate between Morten and me... It's good that we're so different and still respect each other. The tension between us is creative. No one sings like Morten. He's got what it takes and I have great faith in him."

==== a-ha awarded Order of St. Olav ====
The three members of a-ha, Morten Harket, Magne Furuholmen and Waaktaar-Savoy, were appointed Knights of the 1st Class of the Royal Norwegian Order of St. Olav for their contribution to Norwegian music. The Royal Norwegian Order of St. Olav is granted as a reward for distinguished services to their country and mankind. The official ceremony took place on 6 November 2012.

=== Savoy ===
With his wife Lauren Savoy, and drummer Frode Unneland, he has produced many CDs as the band Savoy. In 2001 Waaktaar released his fourth studio album, "Reasons to Stay Indoors", which was again a big success in Norway. On 30 August 2004, Savoy released their fifth studio album called 'Savoy' through their own label, Eleventeen Records.

Savoy achieved great success in Norway, selling over 300,000 records. They have been nominated for Spellemannprisen (Norwegian equivalent of the Grammy Award) four times and have won three times. a-ha's version of the song "Velvet" appears in the film One Night at McCool's and "Whalebone" appears in the highly acclaimed Norwegian film Hawaii, Oslo.

=== Weathervane ===
With Jimmy Gnecco he presented Weathervane as a new project in June 2011. Their self-titled single (Weathervane) appears on the soundtrack for the movie Headhunters (based on the book "Hodejegerne" by Jo Nesbø).

=== Waaktaar ===
In February 2014, Waaktaar-Savoy premiered a new track under the name Waaktaar through a-ha.com. The track is called "Manmade Lake".

=== Waaktaar and Zoe ===
In September 2016, Waaktaar-Savoy formed a new duo with singer Zoe Gnecco (daughter of Weathervane singer Jimmy Gnecco), called Waaktaar and Zoe. They released two singles, "Beautiful Burnout" (2016) and "Tearful Girl" (January 2018), both taken from the album "World of Trouble", released in February 2017.

== Painting ==
Waaktaar-Savoy has painted all his life. His trademark is not starting to paint until the canvas has been fitted with a frame. This trait was played upon in his debut and so far, sole exhibition "Rammer" (meaning "Frames" in Norwegian) in Lillehammer, Norway in 1998.

== Descriptions by the rest of a-ha ==
Magne Furuholmen describes Waaktaar-Savoy thus: "Pål is the person who has meant most to me in my musical development and yet he's the one person I find it most difficult to say anything sensible about. He has incredible will-power and a watchful eye, always searching for material he can use creatively. In a way, I have idolized Pål for years and I still depend on him to help me sort out my own ideas."

Morten Harket describes Waaktaar-Savoy thus: "Pål has unbelievable self-discipline and is a workaholic. He can keep working on what appears to be the same thing over and over again. While I go crazy when I have to go over a song hundreds of times, he can sit with it for hours, trying to find exactly the right mix to achieve the sound he wants. Pål is really the driving force behind a-ha. He's one of the few real artists on the pop rock scene. It's always exciting to hear what he's written."

== Personal life ==
Waaktaar met American filmmaker and musician Lauren Savoy in 1984, and they married in a civil ceremony on 21 December 1991, officiated by the Norwegian Bar Association leader Merete Smith, with family and bandmates in attendance. The couple combined their surnames into Waaktaar-Savoy. They have one child together, True August Waaktaar-Savoy, born in 1999. The family divides its time between New York City and Oslo. After years of fighting the Anglophone media to correct the spelling of his first name, in 1994 he settled on a spelling of "Paul".

== Discography ==
=== With Bridges ===
| Year | Title | Label |
|---|---|---|
| 1980 | Fakkeltog | Våkenatt |

=== With a-ha ===
| Year | Title | Label |
|---|---|---|
| 1985 | Hunting High and Low | Warner Bros. Records |
| 1986 | Scoundrel Days | Warner Bros. Records |
| 1988 | Stay on These Roads | Warner Bros. Records |
| 1990 | East of the Sun, West of the Moon | Warner Bros. Records |
| 1993 | Memorial Beach | Warner Bros. Records |
| 2000 | Minor Earth Major Sky | Warner Bros. Records |
| 2002 | Lifelines | Warner Bros. Records |
| 2005 | Analogue | Universal Music Group |
| 2009 | Foot of the Mountain | Universal Music Group |
| 2010 | 25 | |
| 2011 | Ending on a High Note | |
| 2015 | Cast in Steel | Universal Music Group |
| 2017 | MTV Unplugged – Summer Solstice | Universal Music Group |
| 2022 | True North | |

=== With Savoy ===
| Year | Title | Label |
|---|---|---|
| 1996 | Mary is Coming | Warner Bros. Records |
| 1997 | Lackluster Me | EMI |
| 1999 | Mountains of Time | EMI |
| 2001 | Reasons to Stay Indoors | EMI |
| 2004 | Savoy | Eleventeen Records |
| 2007 | Savoy Songbook Vol. 1 | Universal |
| 2018 | See the Beauty in Your Drab Hometown | Drabant Music |
| 2024 | Under | Eleventeen Records |

=== With Weathervane ===
| Year | Title | Label |
|---|---|---|
| 2011 | Weathervane | Universal Music Norway |

== Awards awarded to Waaktaar-Savoy ==
| Year | Award | Result |
|---|---|---|
| 1999 | Spellemannprisen awarded in the category "Popgroup" for "Mountains of Time" | Won |
| 2001 | Spellemannprisen awarded in the category "Popgroup" for "Reasons to Stay Indoors" | Won |

== Equipment ==
Paul Waaktaar-Savoy has throughout his career with A-HA and Savoy used various brands of guitars. These include among others, guitars from: Gibson (guitar company) * Fender Musical Instruments Corporation * Ibanez * Yamaha Guitars * Rickenbacker * Fano Guitars * Nebelung Guitars * Steinegger Guitars * C. F. Martin & Company * G-sharp guitar * Danelectro and Supro
