= G-sharp guitar =

Musical instrument invented in 1997 by Øivin Fjeld

G-Sharp (G#)
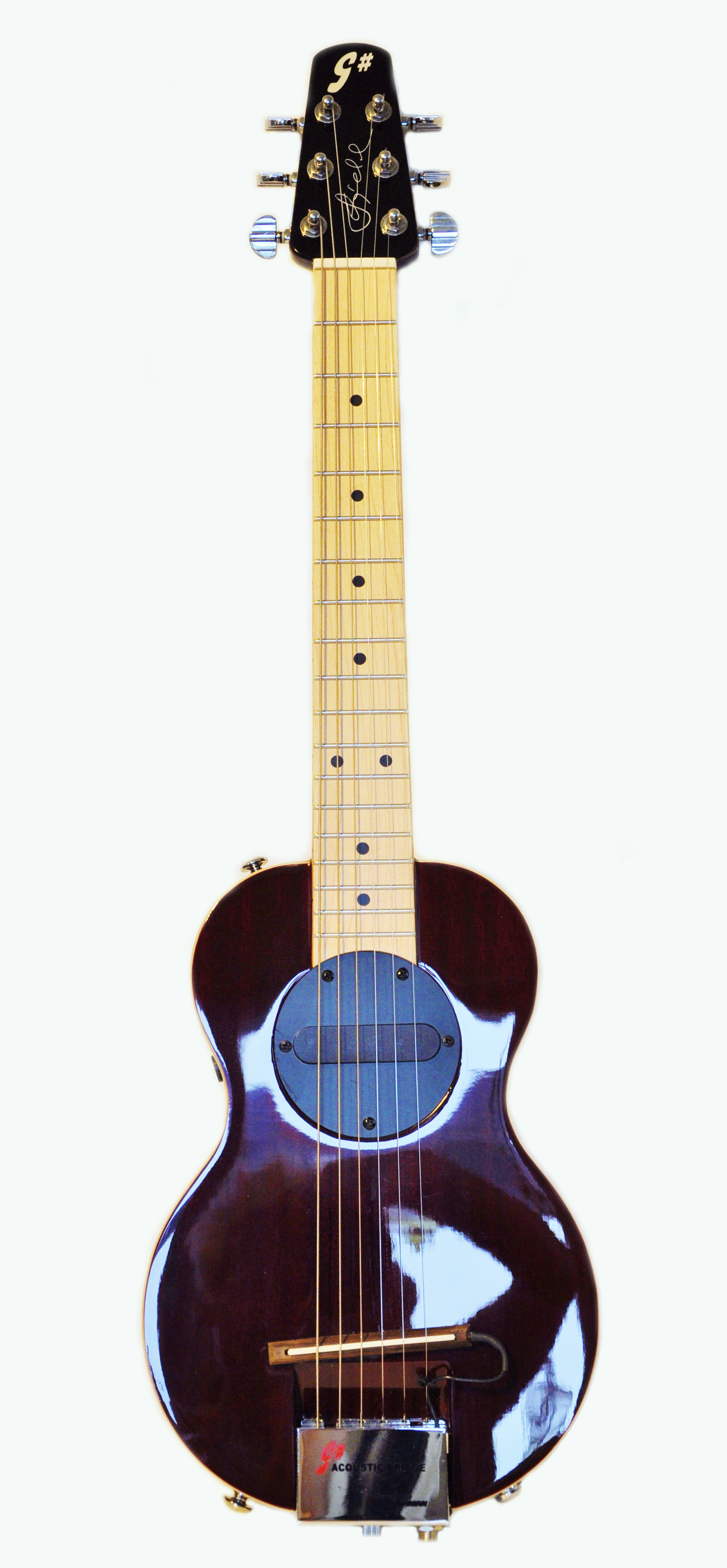
- Wine red G-Sharp OF-1 with Acoustic Bridge
- Manufacturer: G-Sharp Guitars
- Period: 1997 - present

Construction
- Body type: Solid neck-through-body construction

Woods
- Body: Mahogany
- Neck: Mahogany
- Fretboard: Maple or Rosewood

Hardware
- Pickup(s): Single-coil special design, or floating pickup bridge by Øivin Fjeld and Fishman. Additionally Acoustic Bridge by Fishman

Colors available
- Natural, three-tone sunburst, wine red, black and antique white.

The G-Sharp or G# guitar is an instrument in the guitar family, invented in 1997 by the Norwegian luthier Øivin Fjeld. It differs from other guitars mainly because of the short scale length of only 20.87" (530 mm), and the first four frets are actually "missing". The G-Sharp is tuned accordingly, and the standard tuning is identical to putting a capo on the 4th fret on a regular guitar: G#-D#-B-F#-C#-G#

As G# and A♭ is the same musical note it would be correct to say that it is an A-flat instrument, but naming his guitar and his company Fjeld chose to ignore this fact, and it is not mentioned anywhere. The headstock of his guitars is branded with g# and his signature.

== Types and materials ==
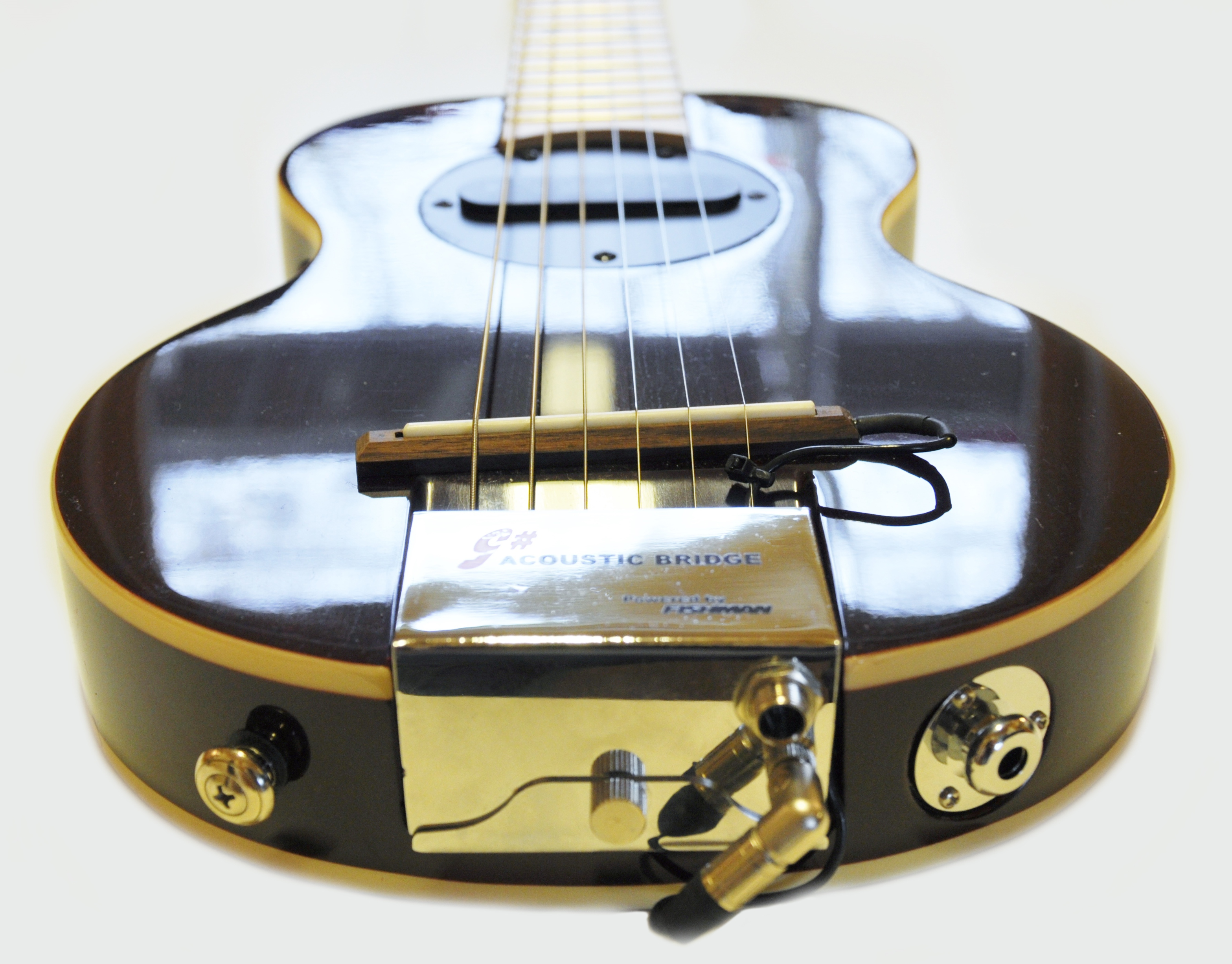
G-Sharp guitar with acoustic bridge.

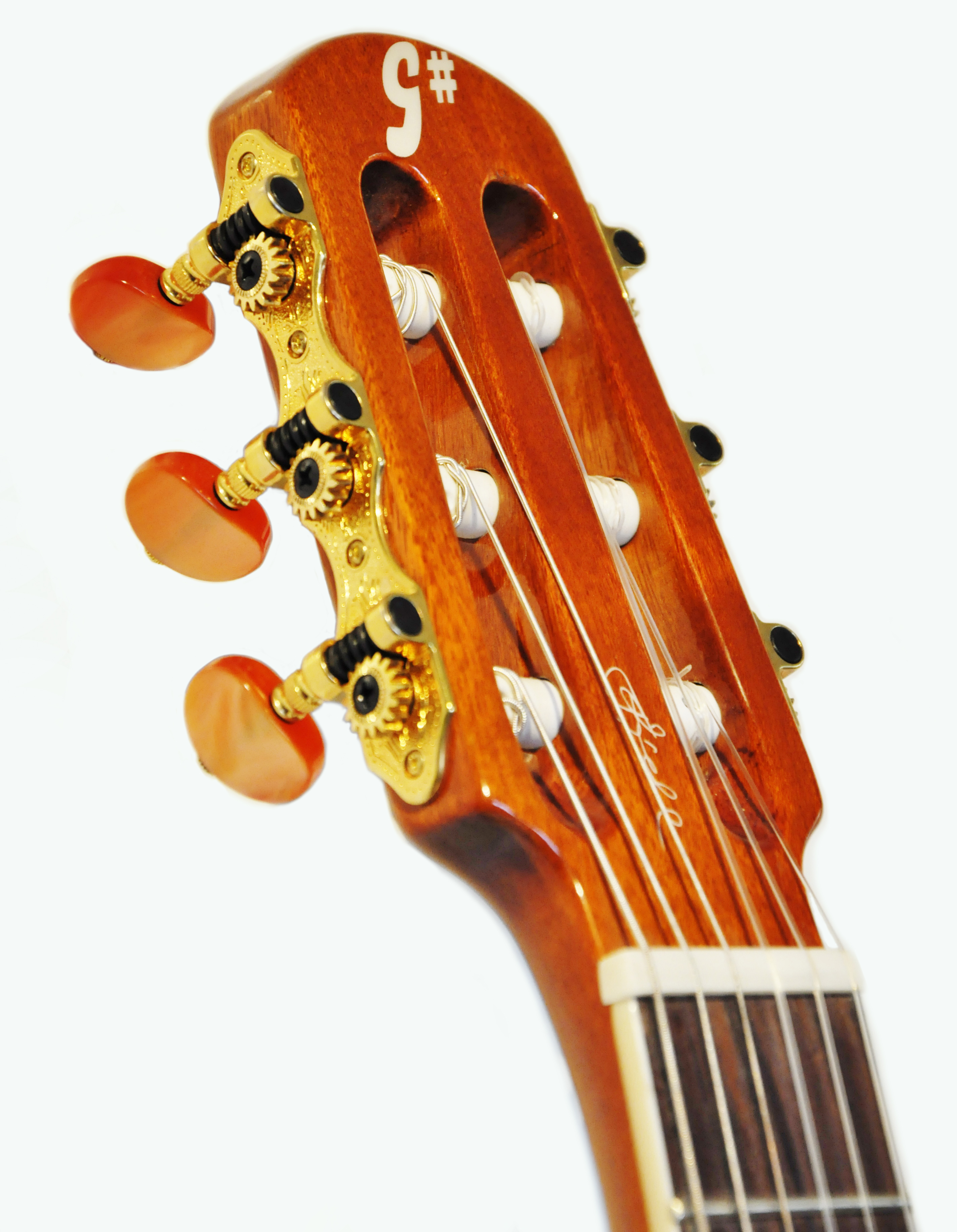
Slotted headstock on Classical G-Sharp guitar.

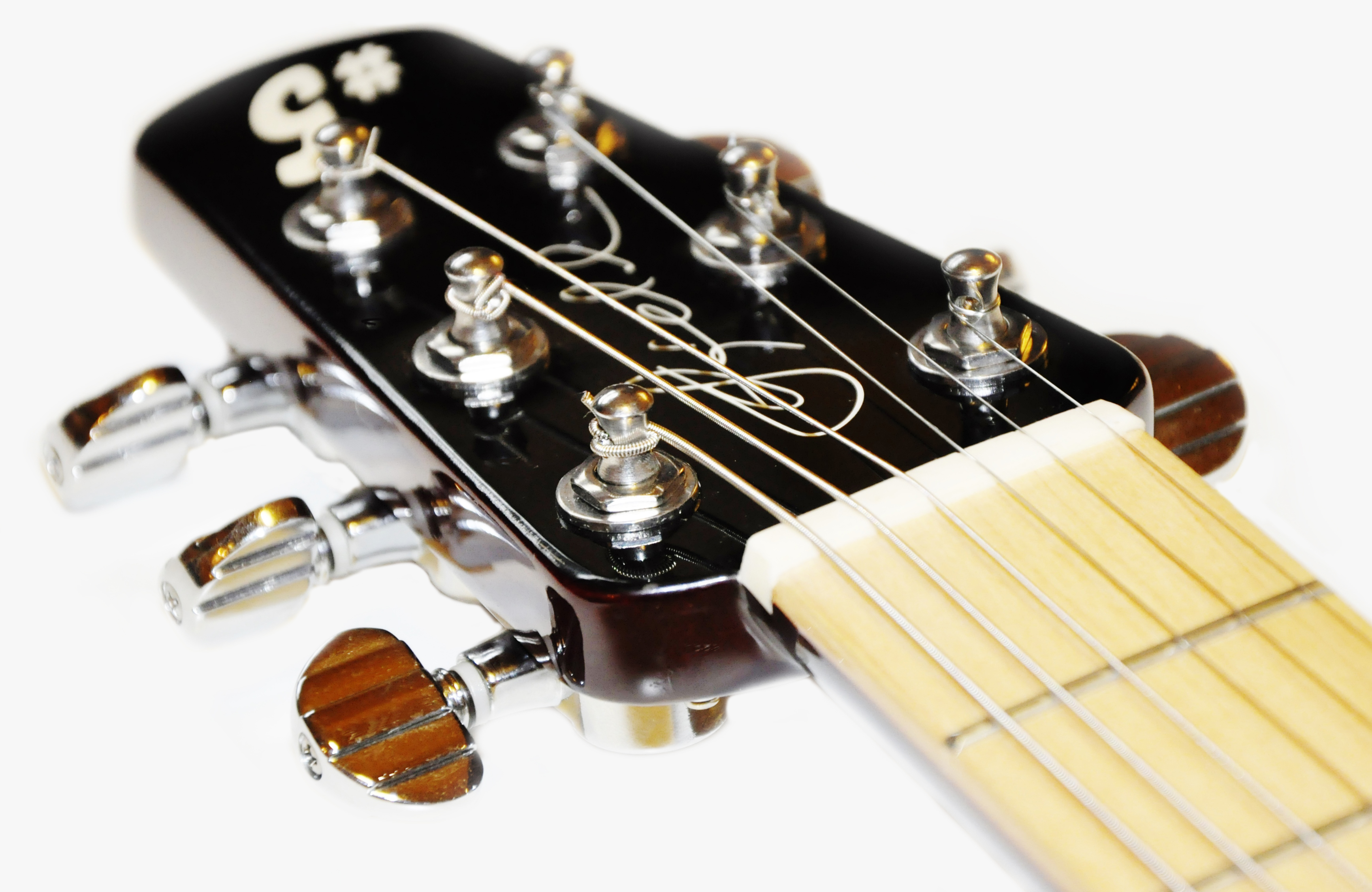
Pitched headstock on G-Sharp Standard G-Sharp guitar.

All guitars are neck-through-body mahogany, with maple or rosewood fretboard, bone nut, two-way truss rod, and a push/push invisible volume control. The standard guitars comes in different finishes; natural, three-tone sunburst, wine red, black and antique white. The classical guitar is natural light brown. The bridge of the guitars is loose, and an intonation template is included to always be able to find the correct placement for perfect pitch. The reason for this is not found in available sources.

=== Standard ===
The standard G-Sharp, also named OF-1 (Oivin Fjeld number 1), is an electric guitar with a specially designed single coil pickup. It is shaped to fit a slot in the body, seemingly shaped to simulate a sound hole.

=== Electric/acoustic ===
The electric/acoustic is identical to the standard G#, but additionally has the optional Acoustic Bridge from Fishman, meant to give the player the option to mimic an acoustic guitar. This means the guitar has two pickups, and two outputs. They can be used simultaneously if desired. The acoustic bridge can easily be taken off or put back on, and can also be purchased as an accessory to the standard G-Sharp guitar.

=== Classical ===
The classical G# has the same body shape and size as the standard, but a wider neck, nylon strings, and also a slotted headstock like most classical guitars.

== History ==
Luthier Øivin Fjeld had been building and repairing guitars for years in his workshop in Fredrikstad, Norway, and for a period of time he was also head of the guitar faculty at the Music Instrument Academy in Norway. This is where he set out to build something unique, and trying out short-scale guitars he found the sound he was looking for with the G#-tuning. This prototype became a template from which his students learnt to build guitars.

Fjeld never planned to commercialize the guitar, but having a lot of guitarist friends who heard rumors and wanted their own, he started a small production. At the time he didn't expect great demand for them, and he was wrong. Requests came from all over the world, and the OF-1 has been in series production since 2005.

=== NAMM Show ===
In 2006 Fjeld brought his guitar to the NAMM music products show in Anaheim, California, borrowing a corner of Ashdown Amplifiers' stand. The response was overwhelming, and he went home with serious requests counting upwards to 20.000 guitars. Among them was Lee Dixon, Eric Clapton's guitar technician, who wanted to put the G-Sharp guitar in all of Clapton's studios. Mark Knopfler also tested the guitar for an entire evening, and later his colleague Guy Fletcher asked for more guitars on his behalf. During the show Fjeld also gave a G-Sharp guitar to Delbert McClinton and Scotty Moore.

=== Fender shows interest ===
In 2006, two major American distributors contacted Fjeld about his guitar, and also Fender Musical Instruments Corporation contacted him, looking to take over both the distribution and the production. The G-Sharp had recently gotten a great review in the U.K. music magazine Guitar Buyer, and this year the guitar went from being interesting to guitar players, to being an interesting investment for larger companies. During the international fair for musical instruments in Frankfurt, Fjeld was contacted by Fender product managers, and asked to send his guitars to their bosses in Scottsdale. The company wanted to make a deal with Fjeld, but the fact that he had not yet patented the guitar, and the size of the project, made him hesitate and finally refuse the offer.

=== Divestment ===
In 2014, Øivin Fjeld sold the G-sharp name, product and company, looking forward to a quieter life. He felt happy the guitar didn't end up potentially in a Fender desk drawer, and is confident the company is in the right hands. The new owner is the U.S. based Norwegian Frank Pedersen, and as of 2014, the G-Sharp company is based in Pleasanton, Kansas USA.

=== G-sharp guitar users /owners ===
- Morten Harket of A-HA - Used the G-Sharp OF-1 on their tour of 2010
- Magne Furuholmen of A-HA - Used the G-Sharp OF-1 on their tour of 2010
- Paul Waaktaar-Savoy of A-HA - Used the G-Sharp OF-1 on their tour of 2010
- Scotty Moore
- Mark Knopfler
- Gary Moore
- Davey Johnstone
- Johnny Winter
- Rick Vito
- Richard Fortus
- Tommy Emmanuel
- Unni Wilhelmsen
- Claudia Scott
- Jarle Bernhoft
- Cato Sundberg of the band Donkeyboy
- Albert Lee
- Shane Theriot
- Ken Hensley
- John Gorka
