= Lackluster Me =

Studio album by Savoy
- Released: October 6, 1997 (original); 2016 (remaster)
- Recorded: 1997
- Genre: Rock
- Length: 52:00 (original release); 49:13 (remaster)
- Labels: EMI Norsk (original); Apollon records (remaster)
- Producers: Lauren & Paul Waaktaar-Savoy

Savoy chronology
Mary Is Coming (1996)	Lackluster Me (1997)	Mountains of Time (1999)

Lackluster Me is the second album released by the band Savoy. It was only officially released in Norway and Sweden. It sold a total of 15,000 copies there and received a Spellemannprisen nomination for best rock album.

In 2016, a remastered edition was released on CD and, for the first time, on LP. For this release, several tracks were shortened.

== Track listing ==
1. "Lackluster Me"
2. "Unsound"
3. "You Should Have Told Me"
4. "Foreign Film"
5. "Flowers for Sylvia"
6. "I Still Cry"
7. "Sycamore Leaves"
8. "Rain"
9. "Butt Out"
10. "This, That & The Other"
11. "Hey Luchie"
12. "Easy"
13. "If You Tell"

== Trivia ==
"Flowers For Sylvia" is an homage to American poet Sylvia Plath.

"Sycamore Leaves" was previously recorded by a-ha on their 1990 album East of the Sun, West of the Moon.

== Personnel ==
- Guitars, bass, vocals, keyboards, programming, arrangements: Paul Waaktaar-Savoy.
- Rhythm guitars and backing vocals (tracks 3, 4, 5, 9 & 12): Lauren Savoy.
- Drums and backing vocals: Frode Unneland.
- Bass: Greg Calvert.
- Cello: James Roven.
- Violín: Timothy Roven.
- String arrangements (tracks 1, 2 & 8): The Vertavo Quartet.
- All songs written by Paul Waaktaar-Savoy and Lauren Savoy except track 6 Paul Waaktaar-Savoy.
- Produced by: Savoy.
- Released by: EMI Norsk.

== Charts ==
Chart (1997)	Peak position
Norwegian Albums (VG-lista)	12
