= Savoy (Norwegian band) =

Norwegian-American rock band

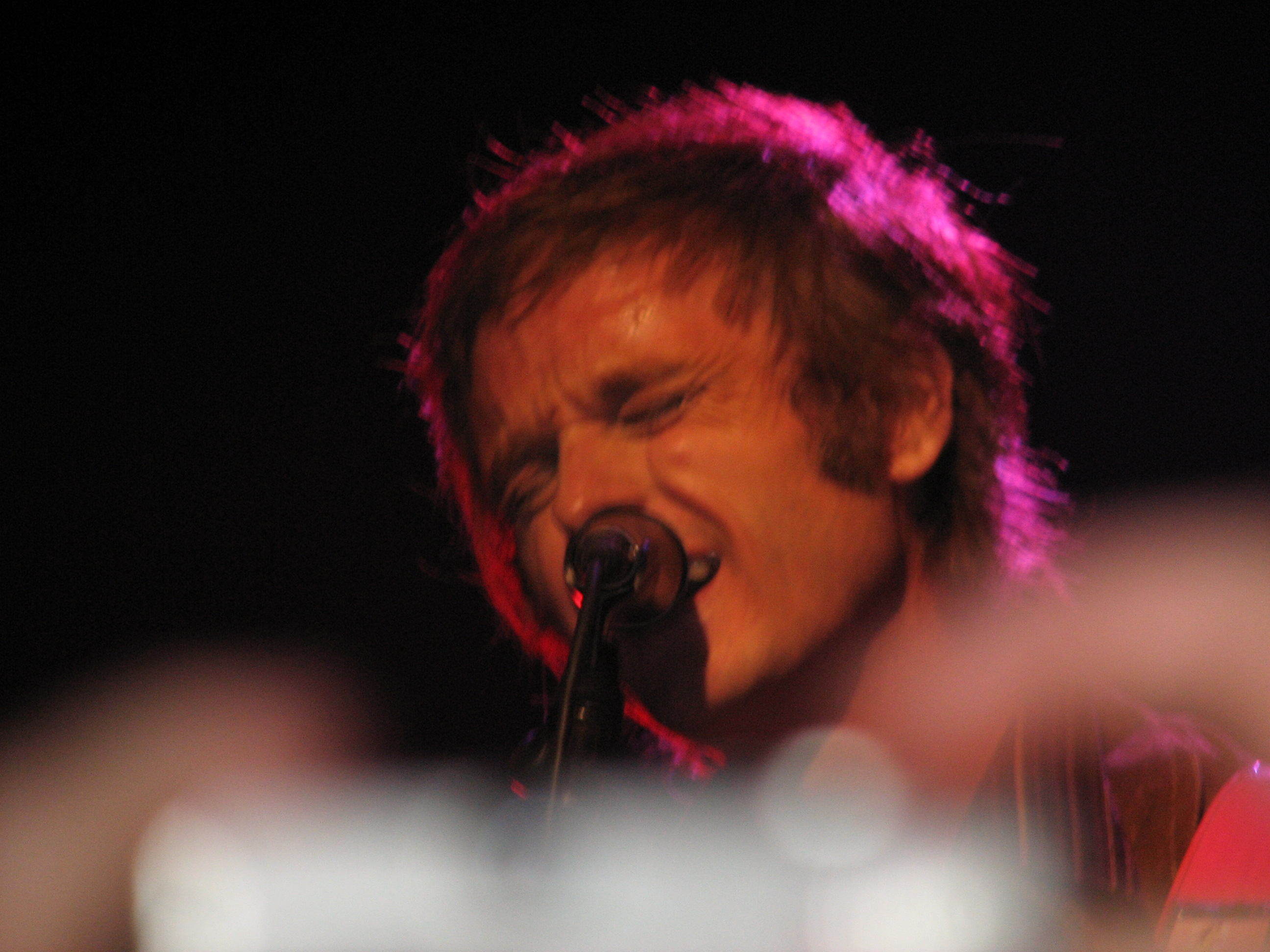
- Waaktaar-Savoy performing live at Irving Plaza in NYC, 2005

Background information
- Origin: Oslo, Norway; Boston, USA; Bergen, Norway
- Genres: Alternative rock; post-grunge
- Years active: 1994–present
- Labels: EMI; Genepool; Eleventeen; Warner Bros.; Universal Music; Drabant Music
- Members: Paul Waaktaar-Savoy; Lauren Savoy; Frode Unneland
- Website: Savoy homepage

Savoy are a Norwegian-American rock trio consisting of Paul Waaktaar-Savoy (famous from Norwegian synth-pop band a-ha) (vocals/guitars/bass/keyboards), his wife Lauren Savoy (vocals/guitars) and Frode Unneland (drums/percussion/backing vocals). The band was formed in 1994 and has released seven studio albums to date.

== Biography ==
Savoy, unlike Waaktaar-Savoy's other band A-ha, has a more down-to-earth indie rock approach to their music. All songs are composed by Paul Waaktaar-Savoy and Lauren Savoy. Lauren herself is known as a film maker, and Frode Unneland is one of Norway's best drummers known from the Bergen music scene as drummer with Chocolate Overdose and Popium. He has also drummed for Norwegian singer-songwriter Sondre Lerche.

Savoy have achieved great critical success in Norway. They have been nominated for 3 Norwegian Grammy Awards (Spellemannprisen) and won two of them, in 2000 and 2002. Their most known hits include "Velvet" (also covered by A-ha), "Rain", "Star", "Grind You Down", "If You Won't Come to the Party" and "Whalebone" (from the soundtrack of the well-acclaimed Norwegian film Hawaii, Oslo). The latter track recycled lyrics from A-ha's 1993 track, "Locust". Savoy have sold a total of 200,000 albums.

On August 6, 2007, Savoy released Savoy Songbook Vol. 1, a double-CD where CD2 is a "best of"-album with 14 tracks, and CD1 contains three new songs and seven re-worked versions of some of their older songs. It will work as an introduction to the band outside Norway (noting a possible worldwide release). The first single from this release, "Karma Boomerang", is one of the new tracks and was released on 13 April 2007. The second single was announced as "Best Western Beauty" and was released on August 5, 2007.

Savoy signed a UK deal with indie label Genepool Records.

In 2016, it was announced that the band's back catalogue would be remastered and re-released by Apollon Records. Lackluster Me and Mountains of Time were subsequently re-released in 2016 and 2017 respectively. As of 2020, the remaining albums have not been re-released.

After some speculation and social media posts confirming recording in 2015, Savoy's first studio album in 14 years, See the Beauty in Your Drab Hometown, was released on January 12, 2018. Under followed in 2024.

== Band members ==
Current members

- Paul Waaktaar-Savoy – Vocals, guitar, bass, keyboards
- Lauren Savoy – Vocals, guitar
- Frode Unneland – Drums, backing vocals

Guest musicians

- Greg Calvert – Bass (1995–1997)
- Geir Luedy – Bass (1997–1998)
- Maya Vik – Bass (2004)
- Christer Ottesen – Bass (2004)
- Jørun Bøgeberg – Bass (2008)
- Preben Grieg-Halvorsen – Keyboards (2008)
- Erin Hill – Harp, backing vocals (2008)
- Linn Frøkedal – Keyboards (2018)
- Chris Holm – Bass (2018)

== Discography ==
=== Studio albums ===
Year	Title	Label
1996	Mary Is Coming	Warner Bros.
1997	Lackluster Me	EMI
1999	Mountains of Time	EMI
2001	Reasons to Stay Indoors	EMI
2004	Savoy	Eleventeen Records
2018	See the Beauty in Your Drab Hometown	Drabant Music
2024	Under	Eleventeen Records

=== Compilation ===
Year	Title	Label
2007	Savoy Songbook Vol. 1	Universal

Awards
Preceded by D'Sound	Recipient of the best Pop band Spellemannprisen; 1999	Succeeded by Briskeby
Preceded by Briskeby	Recipient of the best Pop band Spellemannprisen; 2001	Succeeded by Ephemera
