= See the Beauty in Your Drab Hometown =

Studio album by Savoy
- Released: January 12, 2018
- Genres: Pop, rock
- Length: 39:52
- Label: Drabant Music
- Producers: Pål Waaktaar Savoy, Lauren Savoy, Eliot Leigh

Savoy chronology
Savoy Songbook Vol. 1 (2007)	See the Beauty in Your Drab Hometown (2018)

Singles from See the Beauty in Your Drab Hometown
- 1. "Night Watch" Released: November 24th, 2017; 2. "January Thaw" Released: January 5th, 2018

See the Beauty in Your Drab Hometown is the sixth studio album by the band Savoy. It was released on January 12, 2018. The title of the album comes from the opening line of the song "January Thaw".

== Release ==
There was some speculation about a new album after a series of social media posts by Waaktaar in 2015, confirming that recording was in process. In November 2017, the new album was officially announced with an interview in Dagbladet. The single "Night Watch" was released digitally on November 24, alongside a music video. The album's second single, "January Thaw", also accompanied by a music video, was released on January 5, 2018.

On the eve of the album's release, Savoy held a concert at Parkteatret in Oslo, performing an 18-song setlist featuring songs from their back catalogue as well as from the new album.

== Critical reception ==
See the Beauty in Your Drab Hometown was largely well received. The Electricity Club wrote that the album sounded "fresh and contemporary," calling it "a confident collection... playful, adventurous, and boasting a production that benefits from retaining its rough edges." Dagsavisen wrote that "Savoy shows what a pop band should be, and delivers several great pop moments." Aftenposten commented that the album required time, but "offers a lot of good and timeless pop music." Morgenbladet stated that Savoy had returned like "eternal teens ... with air around their heads," adding that "the frustration and (passive-)aggressiveness that was a part of the previous albums has been replaced with a likeable musical optimism." Hamar Arbeiderblad wrote that the album made "a departure from their previously guitar-driven sound in favour of a shameless flirt with 80s electro-pop... as long as the result is this good, there’s nothing to be ashamed about,” while noting that "one would wish that the band would occasionally gear up and create some larger peaks in the voltage curve." Åsane Tidende stated that the album was "passionate but predictable," saying that "Savoy's latest addition to the discography is no party, but a bit of a breeze you still get."

Bergens Tidende offered a somewhat more critical review, calling the group a "harmless side project", commenting that the album was "well-meaning, but never particularly compelling."

== Track listing ==
No.	Title	Length
1.	"Night Watch"	4:20
2.	"A Month of Sundays"	4:00
3.	"Falls Park"	3:33
4.	"Manmade Lake"	4:59
5.	"Bump"	2:35
6.	"January Thaw"	4:23
7.	"Shy Teens Suffering Silently"	2:45
8.	"We're the Same Way"	4:34
9.	"Sunlit Byways"	4:13
10.	"(My) Weathervane"	4:30
Total length:		39:52

== Credits ==
=== Savoy ===
- Pål Waaktaar Savoy: vocals, guitar, bass, keyboard
- Lauren Savoy: vocals, guitar
- Frode Unneland: drums, vocals

=== Additional Musicians ===
- Karl Oluf Wennerberg: drums (tracks 1 & 2)
- Joe Mardin: drums (track 4)

== Charts ==
Chart (2018)	Peak position
Norwegian Albums (VG-lista)	7
