= Summer Moved On =

2000 single by a-ha

Single by a-ha

from the album Minor Earth Major Sky
- B-side: "Barely Hanging On"
- Released: 25 March 2000
- Length: 4:36 (album edit); 4:06 (radio edit)
- Label: WEA
- Songwriter: Paul Waaktaar-Savoy
- Producers: Andreas "Boogieman" Herbig; Roland Spremberg

A-ha singles chronology
"Shapes That Go Together" (1994)	"Summer Moved On" (2000)	"Minor Earth Major Sky" (2000)

Music video
- "Summer Moved On" on YouTube

"Summer Moved On" is a song by Norwegian synth-pop band a-ha, released as the group's first single after more than six years. The lead single from their sixth studio album, Minor Earth Major Sky (2000), the song was released in Europe on 25 March 2000 by WEA and was given a UK release on 22 May 2000. It was originally hastily written after a-ha agreed to a one-time reunion at the Nobel Peace Prize concert in 1998. The song became a number-one radio hit in much of Europe, including topping the chart in the band's native Norway. On the song, Morten Harket achieved the European record for the longest note held in a top-40 pop song; he sustains a chest voice note for 20.2 seconds (eight measures). Its music video was directed by Adam Berg and filmed in Spain.

== Critical reception ==
The song received positive reviews from music critics. A reviewer from Irish Evening Herald described it as a "soaring and powerful ballad". Sylvia Patterson from NME wrote, "And now they're back! Swoon! And they're still REALLY GOOD, if not quite The Revolution. Demolition string-quaver quiver-pop-a-ruddy-kimbo as Morten trills 'staaaaay!!!' and a thousand moonbeams dart from black skies of nu-pop baloney on a clifftop everglade under a wind-machine in Rio like 'NSync and all the rest of it never happened. Or, if you like, it's a bit James Bond, 'cos they did the James Bond theme tune once, they were that good. Sigh." In 2025, Classic Pop magazine ranked "Summer Moved On" number 10 in their list of "Top 20 Comeback Singles".

== Music video ==
The music video for "Summer Moved On" was directed by Swedish director Adam Berg and filmed in Cádiz, Spain at the beginning of March 2000.

== MTV Unplugged appearance ==
In 2017, a-ha appeared on the television series MTV Unplugged and played and recorded acoustic versions of many of their popular songs for the album MTV Unplugged – Summer Solstice in Giske, Norway, including "Summer Moved On" (featuring Alison Moyet).

== Track listings ==
- European CD single
1. "Summer Moved On" (album edit) – 4:39
2. "Barely Hanging On" (album version) – 3:54
- European maxi-CD single
1. "Summer Moved On" (radio edit) – 4:06
2. "Summer Moved On" (album edit) – 4:39
3. "Barely Hanging On" – 3:51
4. "Summer Moved On" (remix) – 6:02
- UK CD and cassette single
1. "Summer Moved On" (radio edit) – 4:06
2. "Barely Hanging On" (single version) – 3:54
3. "Summer Moved On" (remix) – 6:02

== Charts ==
=== Weekly charts ===
Weekly chart performance for "Summer Moved On"
Chart (2000)	Peak position
Austria (Ö3 Austria Top 40)	10
Belgium (Ultratip Bubbling Under Flanders)	2
Belgium (Ultratop 50 Wallonia)	26
Czech Republic (IFPI)	11
Europe (Eurochart Hot 100)	27
Germany (GfK)	8
Hungary (Mahasz)	7
Ireland (IRMA)	46
Netherlands (Single Top 100)	74
Norway (VG-lista)	1
Poland Airplay (Music & Media)	2
Scottish Singles Sales (Official Charts)	32
Spain (Promusicae)	19
Spain Airplay (M&M)	2
Switzerland (Schweizer Hitparade)	14
UK Singles (Official Charts)	33

=== Year-end charts ===
Year-end chart performance for "Summer Moved On"
Chart (2000)	Position
Europe Border Breakers (Music & Media)	3
Switzerland (Schweizer Hitparade)	100

== Release history ==
Region	Date	Format(s)	Label(s)	Ref.
Europe	25 March 2000	CD	WEA	
United Kingdom	22 May 2000	CD; cassette	WEA	
