= D'Sound =

Norwegian neo soul band

- Also known as: Sweet & Sour (1993-94)
- Origin: Oslo, Norway
- Genres: Neo soul, funk, acid jazz
- Years active: 1993–present
- Labels: daWorks; Polydor; Sony Music; Virgin
- Members: Jonny Sjo; Kim Ofstad; Simone Eriksrud; Mirjam Omdal
- Website: dsound.com

D'Sound (stylized as d'sound) is a Norwegian neo soul band based in Oslo, Norway. The band was formed in 1993 with a line-up composed of lead vocalist Simone Eriksrud, bassist Jonny Sjo and drummer Kim Ofstad. After Eriksrud's initial departure in 2018, the band announced that they would continue as a duo and collaborate with various international artists to provide vocals for future material. Bae Louie band member Mirjam Omdal joined in 2019 as a lead vocalist. Eriksrud returned to the band as a touring and recording member in 2022.

== Band history ==
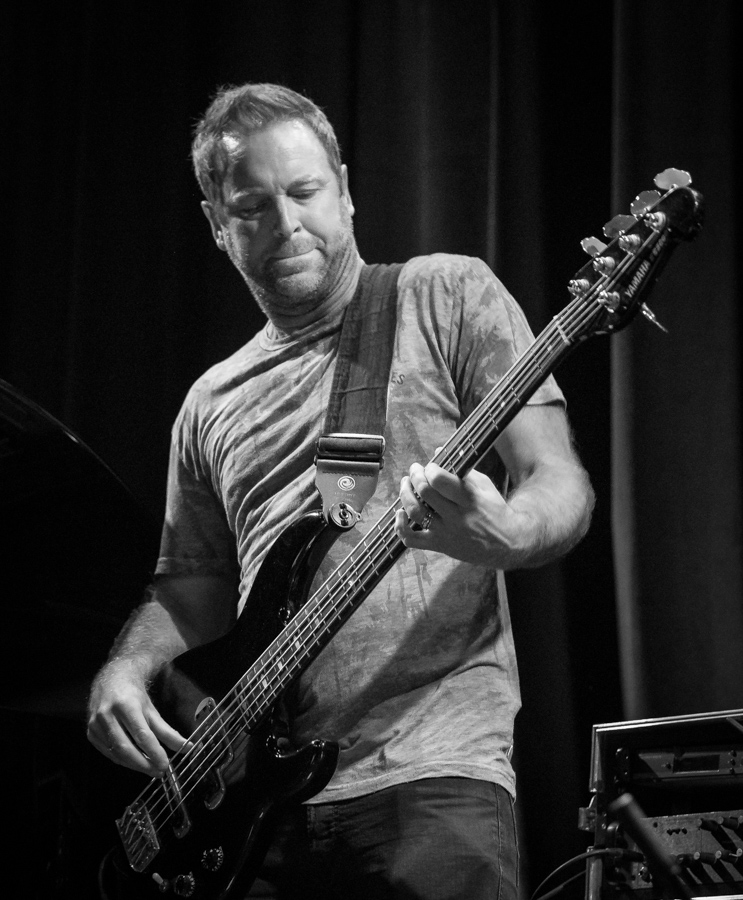
Jonny Sjo in 2017

Drummer Kim Ofstad (born 25 November 1969) and bassist Jonny Sjo (born 7 April 1969) met while both attending Berklee College of Music. D'Sound was formed back in 1993 in Oslo with vocalist Simone Eriksrud (nee Larsen; born 21 August 1970) at a coincident rehearsal-meeting. Their debut album, Spice of Life, was released in 1997, followed by the successful single "Real Name", and was nominated for two "Spellemannpriser", the Norwegian equivalent of the Brits (United Kingdom) and the Grammys (United States). D'Sound's blend of jazz and pop with funky elements was well received, and they also gained recognition as a live act. Their second album, Beauty Is a Blessing, was released in 1998 and won the "Spellemannpris" for Best Norwegian Pop Group. It received platinum certification in Norway; however, the album was never released internationally. The second single, "Down on the Street" (originally a hit for British jazz-funk band Shakatak) also entered the UK club chart. The single "Tattooed on My Mind" was released with favorable reception in Southeast Asia.

In 2000, the band resumed working together on their next album in Jonny Sjo's home studio. After a long period of writing material, Talkin' Talk was recorded. For the first time, the band also produced the album, along with their long-time keyboardist Stein Austrud. In the production of their third album, D'Sound was heavily influenced by modern R&B American artists such as Angie Stone, D'Angelo, Jill Scott and Erykah Badu. The album Talkin' Talk was mixed in Virginia Beach, United States by Serban Ghenea, whose credits include work for Janet Jackson and Prince. For the subsequent tour, D'Sound joined with numerous national and international musicians and toured Norway with the songs from their three albums. Several international musicians like DJ Kemit from American hip-hop group Arrested Development also joined the band in touring. The title track from the album was used by Nokia in an ad campaign in 2001 to promote their 8310 cellphone in Asia, where the album gained a favourable reception. The verses of this song almost sound like Kelis's song Caught Out There.

In 2003, the group released Doublehearted, which featured the hit single "Do I Need a Reason". In 2004, their first greatest hits album was released, entitled Smooth Escapes - The Very Best of D'Sound. The album was followed by the release of their fifth studio album My Today, the following year. The band took a break after the release of their fourth album. Kim Ofstad left D'Sound in 2010, paring the band down to a duo of Eriksrud and Sjo, but returned in 2013.

In June 2018, Simone Eriksrud announced her departure from D'Sound and was replaced by Mirjam Omdal because the former wanted to spend more time with the rest of her family.

In March 2019, D'Sound participated in the Norwegian national selection for the Eurovision Song Contest 2019 (the Melodi Grand Prix), with their new song "Mr. Unicorn" and finished in third place. In September 2019, D’Sound released their eighth studio album, Unicorn. Its cover features Sjo's brother and its title is dedicated to him. It contained tracks that featured Omdal as the band's main vocalist and collaborations with other artists and musicians such Armi Millare. In 2020, Omdal announced that she had returned to her band Bae Louie as a lead vocal but will continue to collaborate with Ofstad and Sjo as a touring member.

In 2021, D'Sound announced that their ninth studio album “25” will be released in January 2022. The album's title commemorates their 25 years since their debut album in 1997. Unlike the previous release, the album's tracklist will be a complete collaboration with many international artists and songwriters. Band vocalists Eriksrud and Omdal will also feature in some tracks. The first single and video from the album, “Save Some”, was released in May 2021 and kicked off their 25th anniversary since their debut with “Real Name” in 1996. “Save Some” is a collaboration with American R&B artist and songwriter Macy Gray. In September 2021, the group collaborated with Barbadian singer Shontelle for the album's second single “Necessary Love”. In December 2021, the band announced that they had reunited with Eriksrud through the release of the third single “Flashback”. The band began promoting the single and the album's release as a trio in 2022.

== Line-up ==
=== Current members ===
- Jonny Sjo - bass, occasional guitar, vocals (1993–present)
- Kim Ofstad - drums, percussion (1993–2010, 2013–present)
- Simone Eriksrud - piano, guitar, lead vocals (1993–2018; touring member 2022–present)
- Mirjam Omdal - lead vocals (2018–2020; touring member 2020–present)

== Discography ==
=== Studio albums ===
| Title | Album details | Peak chart positions | Certifications |
| Title | Album details | NOR | Certifications |
|---|---|---|---|
| Spice of Life | Released: 1997; Label: PolyGram (#533501-2); Formats: CS, CD | 11 | |
| Beauty Is a Blessing | Released: 1998; Label: PolyGram (#557766-2); Formats: CD | 1 | NOR: Gold |
| Talkin' Talk | Released: 12 March 2001; Label: Virgin (#81001820); Formats: CD | 3 | |
| Doublehearted | Released: 26 May 2004; Label: daWorks Records (#DACD505); Formats: CS, CD | 3 | |
| My Today | Released: 6 March 2006; Label: daWorks Records (#DADC530); Formats: CD | 16 | |
| Starts and Ends | Released: 5 October 2009; Label: Mountain Music (#5099930799523); Formats: CD | 24 | |
| Signs | Released: 10 July 2015; Label: RCA/Sony (#88843048472); Formats: LP, CD | 8 | |
| Unicorn | Released: 6 September 2019; Label: daWorks Records (#DACD864); Formats: LP, CD | — | |
| 25 | Released: 21 January 2022; Label: daWorks Records (#DACD889); Formats: Digital | — | |
"—" denotes items that did not chart or were not released in that territory.

=== Compilation albums ===
| Title | Album details | Peak chart positions |
| Title | Album details | NOR |
|---|---|---|
| Smooth Escapes - The Very Best of D'Sound | Released: 2004; Label: daWorks Records (#DACD514); Formats: CD | 2 |
"—" denotes items that did not chart or were not released in that territory.

=== Live albums ===
| Title | Album details |
|---|---|
| Live at Rockefeller Music Hall 2001 | Released: 2001; Label: Virgin (#81107324); Formats: CD |
| Acoustic Live Session | Released: 27 June 2006; Label: daWorks Records; Formats: Digital download |

=== Singles ===
- "Real Name" (1996)
- "All I Wanna Do" (1996)
- "Tattooed on My Mind" (1998)
- "Ain't Giving Up" (1998)
- "Down on the Street" (1998)
- "Disco Ironic" (1999)
- "Talkin' Talk" (2001)
- "Sing My Name" (2001)
- "Do I Need a Reason" (2002)
- "I Just Can't Wait" (2003)
- "Breathe In, Breathe Out" (2003)
- "I Give Myself Away" (2003)
- "Romjulsdrøm" (with Kringkastingsorkestret) (2003)
- "If You Get Scared" (2004)
- "Universally" (2005)
- "Green Eyes" (2005)
- "Feel Again" (2005)
- "Lose Control" (2013)
- "Love Like Rain" (2014)
- "Dance with Me" (2015)
- "If You Don't Know" (2017)
- "Only One" (2017)
- "It's Just Me" (2018)
- "Join Me in My Head" (2018)
- "Lykkelig" (featuring Armi Millare) (2018)
- "Mr. Unicorn" (2019)
- "This Island Is Mine" (2019)
- "Somewhere in Between" (featuring Armi Millare) (2019)
- "Aftershock" (2019)
- "Good Intentions" (2020)
- "Save Some" (with Macy Gray) (2021)
- "Necessary Love" (with Shontelle) (2021)
- "Good Nature" (with Pher and Cory Henry) (2021)
- "Run for Cover" (with Armi Millare) (2021)
- "Flashback" (2021)
- "I Believe in You" (2023)
- "Get Used to It" (2024)
- "Mess Without This" (2024)
- "Your Love Keeps Me" (with Macy Gray) (2024)
- "Crybaby" (2025)
- "Golden" (2025)
- "Unfold Me" (2026)

Awards
| Preceded by Velvet Belly | Recipient of the Pop Band Spellemannprisen; 1998 | Succeeded by Savoy |
