= Lauren Savoy =

American musician and film director

Lauren Lucia Savoy is an American musician and film director.

Upon graduation from the London Film School, Savoy started directing music videos and commercials. She has original songs in the movie "Hawaii, Oslo" as well as "One Night at Mcool's."
