= Spanish Steps (song) =

Single by Morten Harket

from the album Wild Seed
- B-side: "Girl"
- Released: 1995 (Norway); 1996 (UK)
- Length: 4:08
- Label: Warner Bros.
- Songwriter(s): Torstein Flakne; Håvard Rem; Morten Harket
- Producer(s): Christopher Neil

Morten Harket singles chronology
"A Kind of Christmas Card" (1995)	"Spanish Steps" (1995)	"Los Angeles" (1996)

Spanish Steps is a song by the Norwegian singer Morten Harket, which was released in 1995 as the second single from his debut solo album Wild Seed. It was written by Torstein Flakne (music, lyrics), Håvard Rem (lyrics) and Harket (lyrics), and produced by Christopher Neil. "Spanish Steps" reached No. 14 on the Norwegian VG-lista chart.

== Background ==
"Spanish Steps" originated as "5,000 Miles", a track written by Torstein Flakne and intended for his band Stage Dolls. When Norwegian producer Bjørn Nessjø heard the song in 1991, he convinced Flakne to allow Ole Edvard Antonsen to record an instrumental version for the Norwegian trumpeter's album Tour De Force, which was produced by Nessjø and released in 1992. When Nessjø became involved in engineering Harket's debut solo album, he suggested Harket record the song. The lyrics for "Spanish Steps" were contributed by Harket, Håvard Rem and Flakne.

The song received a single release in Norway in November 1995, followed by a UK release in February 1996. It was a commercial success in Norway, reaching No. 14 on the VG-lista chart, but failed to chart in the UK. The song's music video was shot at NRK Studios in Oslo in January 1996 and features Norwegian-Swedish-Turkish model Vendela Kirsebom.

== Critical reception ==
Upon its release as a single, Simon Price of Melody Maker described "Spanish Steps" as "unexpectedly, shockingly great" and wrote, "'Guess you've got my number... should I be on your mind...' croaks a heartbroken Harket, kicking through the sierra into a Sevillan sunset, his leather wristbands fraying in sympathy." He suggested readers "imagine the Smiths' 'Well I Wonder' reworked by Enigma" and considered it "the best thing Harket's done" since a-ha's "The Sun Always Shines on T.V.", "I've Been Losing You" and "Manhattan Skyline". In a 2017 retrospective on Harket's solo career, Barry Page of The Electricity Club noted the song "drifts along in a pleasing 'Streets of Philadelphia' kind of way".

== Track listing ==
Cassette single

1. "Spanish Steps" – 4:08
2. "Girl" – 3:37

CD single

1. "Spanish Steps" – 4:08
2. "Girl" – 3:37
3. "Lord" – 3:52

CD single (UK promo)

1. "Spanish Steps" – 4:08

== Personnel ==
Production

- Christopher Neil – producer
- Bjørn Nessjø – engineer
- Kjetil Bjerkestrand – arranger on "Spanish Steps"
- Simon Hurrell – mixing on "Spanish Steps"
- Lasse Hafreager – arranger on "Lord"
- Truls Birkeland – mixing on "Lord"

== Charts ==
Chart (1995)	Peak position
Norway (VG-lista)	14
