= Wild Seed (album) =

Studio album by Morten Harket
- Released: 4 September 1995
- Recorded: 1994–95 in Trondheim and Oslo, Norway; and Oxfordshire and London, England
- Genres: Pop rock, alternative rock
- Length: 49:56
- Label: Warner Bros.
- Producer: Christopher Neil

Morten Harket chronology
Poetenes Evangelium (1993)	Wild Seed (1995)	Vogts Villa (1996)

Singles from Wild Seed
- 1. "A Kind of Christmas Card" Released: 1995; 2. "Spanish Steps" Released: 1995; 3. "Los Angeles" Released: 1996

Wild Seed is the second studio album and first English-language album by Norwegian pop singer Morten Harket. The album was released on 4 September 1995 through Warner Bros. Records. After a-ha went on a hiatus in 1994, Harket began recording Wild Seed with British record producer Christopher Neil, who previously worked with the band on their fourth studio album, East of the Sun, West of the Moon (1990). Wild Seed charted at number one in Norway and at number 89 in the United Kingdom. It has since sold 160.000 copies in Norway.

== Critical reception ==
Professional ratings
Review scores
Source	Rating
AllMusic	3/5 stars
The Guardian	4/5 stars
The Scotsman	4/5 stars

Upon its release, Caroline Sullivan of The Guardian commented, "The A-ha frontman's solo debut reveals that, all this time, a poet's soul dwelt beneath that camera-pleasing exterior. Harket's brooding balladry calls to mind John Martyn and his sultry like, with a touch of Leonard Cohen in his low voice on 'Brodsky Tune'. If he's not as gifted a lyricist, he's got a lovely grasp of the rhythm of language." Myles Palmer of The Scotsman praised Wild Seed as an "excellent solo debut" on which producer Christopher Neil "frames Harket's appealing voice between chunky drums and spacey synthesisers, uses the guitar cleverly, and proves that good production is all about what you leave out". Ryan Gilbey of The Independent was negative in his review, writing, "If A-ha was his Wham! then Wild Seed is his Listen Without Prejudice Vol. 1, a collection of aching ballads which cover everything from tortured love to painful longing. Not a lot of ground. Even less when sung over music which belongs in a lift, despite the majesty of Harket's voice."

== Track listing ==
No.	Title	Lyrics	Music	Length
1.	"A Kind of Christmas Card"	Håvard Rem	Morten Harket	4:06
2.	"Spanish Steps"	Rem, Harket, Torstein Flakne	Flakne	4:07
3.	"Half in Love Half in Hate"	Ole Sverre Olsen	Harket	4:45
4.	"Brodsky Tune"	Joseph Brodsky, Harket	Harket	4:23
5.	"Wild Seed"	Harket	Harket	4:48
6.	"Los Angeles"	Rem	Harket	4:26
7.	"East Timor"	Henning Kramer Dahl, Rem, Harket	Geir Kolbu	4:12
8.	"Lay Me Down Tonight"	Rem, Harket	Harket	2:17
9.	"Tell Me What You See"	Rem, Harket	Harket	4:50
10.	"Stay"	Rem, Harket	Harket	3:29
11.	"Lord"	Rem	Harket	3:46
12.	"Ready to Go Home"	Andrew Gold, Graham Gouldman	Gold, Gouldman	4:33

Japanese bonus track
No.	Title	Writer(s)	Length
13.	"A Change Is Gonna Come"	Sam Cooke	5:56

South Korean bonus track
No.	Title	Writer(s)	Length
13.	"Can't Take My Eyes Off You"	Bob Crewe, Bob Gaudio	3:46

- "Brodsky Tune" lyrics from the poem "Bosnia Tune" by Joseph Brodsky, chorus by Morten Harket.
- "Lay Me Down Tonight", "Tell Me What You See" and "Stay" are based on a Norwegian poem by Håvard Rem.
