= Poetenes Evangelium =

Studio album by Morten Harket
- Released: 1993
- Genre: Alternative rock, synthpop, religious
- Length: 44:30
- Label: Kirkelig Kulturverksted
- Producer: Erik Hillestad

Morten Harket chronology
Poetenes Evangelium (1993)	Wild Seed (1995)

Poetenes Evangelium is the debut solo album by Norwegian singer Morten Harket, released in 1993 on the label Kirkelig Kulturverksted.

== Review ==
The title translates into The gospel according to poets and was a follow-up from a book anthology of classical 20th century Norwegian poetry depicting the life and death of Christ. All 12 tracks are unedited poetry written by Norwegian authors Jens Bjørneboe, Inger Hagerup, Erik Fosnes Hansen, Kaj Skagen, Georg Johannesen, Arnold Eidslott and Håvard Rem. All music is composed by Øivind Varkøy for this album.

== Track listing ==
1. "Natten" (The Night) - 3:16
2. "Hymne Til Josef" (Hymn to Joseph) - 5:03
3. "Salome" - 3:48
4. "Elisabeth Synger Ved Johannes Døperens Død" (Elisabeth Sings at the Death of John the Baptist) - 3:22
5. "Fra Templet" (At the Temple) - 2:44
6. "Hvor Krybben Stod" (Where the Cradle Stood) - 3:15
7. "Rytteren" (The Rider) - 3:02
8. "Sviket" (The Betrayal) - 3:55
9. "Påske" (Easter) - 4:02
10. "Den Fremmede" (The Stranger) - 3:30
11. "Den Fremmede Taler Til Mennesket" (The Stranger Addresses Man) - 3:47
12. "Engelen" (The Angel) - 3:58

== Personnel ==
- Frode Alnæs - guitar
- Kjetil Bjerkestrand - keyboards
- Per Hillestad - drums
- Kjetil Saunes - bass (tracks #11 & #12)

Strings

- Bjørg Værnes - cello
- Nora Taksdal - viola
- Berit Værnes, Øyvor Volle - violin

Chamber choir

- Oslo Kammerkor - conducted by Grethe Helgerød (tracks #6 & #12)

== Credits ==
- Arranged by – Kjetil Bjerkestrand
- Mastered by – Bjørn Engelmann
- Music by – Øivind Varkøy
- Producer & additional recordings – Erik Hillestad
- Additional recordings – Ulf Holand
- Recorded & mixed by – Jan Erik Kongshaug
