= Foot of the Mountain =

Studio album by A-ha
- Released: 12 June 2009
- Recorded: January – May 2009
- Studios: United States; (Water Music, Beat 360, The Alabaster Room); Norway; (Yoga Studio, Alabaster Cottage, Malabar Studio, Rainbow Studio); Germany; (Gaga Studios, Bookie Park Studios); United Kingdom; (Real World Studios)
- Genre: Synth-pop
- Length: 40:45
- Labels: We Love Music; Polydor; Universal
- Producers: A-ha; Steve Osborne; Mark Saunders; Roland Spremberg; Erik Ljunggren

A-ha chronology
Analogue (2005)	Foot of the Mountain (2009)	25 (2010)

Singles from Foot of the Mountain
- 1. "Foot of the Mountain" Released: 5 May 2009; 2. "Nothing Is Keeping You Here" Released: 21 September 2009; 3. "Shadowside" Released: 21 September 2009

Foot of the Mountain is the ninth studio album by the Norwegian synth-pop band A-ha. It was released on 19 June 2009 and reached No. 1 on the German Albums Chart and No. 2 on the Norwegian Albums Chart. In its first week in the UK, the album debuted at No. 5, the group's highest chart placing in that country since Stay on These Roads in 1988.

The overall sound of the record marks a return to the synth-pop style the band became famous for in the mid-1980s. Keyboardist Magne Furuholmen describes the album thus: "It's an album that incorporates the key elements that first defined the band: soaring vocals, synth hooks, yearning lyrics and melodic melancholia."

Foot of the Mountain was A-ha's last full-length album before their split in 2010 and the last to use the new A-ha logo before they reunited and reverted to their old logo. However, they did release a further compilation album 25 with their new single "Butterfly, Butterfly (The Last Hurrah)" before reuniting in 2015.

== Recording process ==
In a 2007 interview with the Norwegian TV channel TVTromsø, Paul Waaktaar-Savoy expressed frustration over the time it took to produce new material with the band: "The trouble with us is that we're never in sync. Right now, I'm eager to get going on the new album. I'm telling everybody that the new album is coming out next year and that it's going to be great. But the other two are of course just starting to get into their solo projects again and want to prioritize those for the time being." Getting around to recording the follow-up to Analogue took four years due to the individual projects of the band members. Paul's band Savoy released Savoy Songbook Vol. 1, Magne released his second solo album A Dot of Black in the Blue of Your Bliss and Morten Harket released his second English-language solo album Letter from Egypt. Despite touring quite extensively between 2005 and 2008, the focus of the group was not directed towards recording. The album ended up being recorded in a relatively short period of time (between January - May 2009) with Steve Osborne, Mark Saunders and Roland Spremberg producing.

The recording session took place in several studios around the world. In the US sessions were held at Water Music, Beat 360 and The Alabaster Room in New York City. In Norway recordings were made at Yoga Studio, Alabaster Cottage, Malabar Studio and Rainbow Studio. In the UK the band recorded at Real World Studios, whilst in Germany they used Gaga Studios and Boogie Park Studios.

== Inspirations ==
The track "Riding the Crest", named by Paul Waaktaar-Savoy as "an electro-blues", is heavily inspired by Arcade Fire and their album Neon Bible. Being the principal songwriter on the album, Waaktaar-Savoy also got inspired by his changing surroundings, dividing his time between New York City and Oslo. ""Shadowside" feels quite Norwegian in the melody, the chords and the mood. "The Bandstand" reminds me of my first trip to New York City in the early '80s, before A-ha were famous. Songs are like a photo-album – they can really send you back. And this one reminds me of arriving at Port Authority with $35 in my pocket, sporting really high, yellow, almost see-through synthesizer-hair, wearing a tiger-shirt and a brown suit, looking like an alien!" The title track, "Foot of the Mountain" – examines one of the fundamental conflicts of modern life, the pull between nature and big-city civilization: for Paul, the buzz of New York City versus the beauty and isolation of Norway: "It's the dilemma of loving a city life, yet secretly wondering if we'd be happier being surrounded by open fields and sweeping mountains." "Real Meaning" is inspired by Waaktaar-Savoy calling home only to be greeted by his answering machine. The idea behind "Start the Simulator" was to make a heartfelt song using technical language: "The basic idea was to make a song using only technical terms and phrases, and still make it very emotional and personal. There is such poetry in the old Apollo manuals: "switch to Omni Bravo" and "the bright ejector blanket." The latter should probably be "ejecta blanket".

Magne's solo work has been sampled extensively, with the song "Foot of the Mountain" originally appeared as a solo track, on Magne's last solo album and two tracks from the A-ha album, have borrowed parts from Magne's album.

== Artwork ==
The album's artwork is designed by Martin Kvamme, who has worked with A-ha on previous occasions, both as a band and on solo projects. Stian Andersen, Guy Berryman, Istockphoto and Helge Kvamme supplied photographs for the inner sleeve. Martin Kvamme said the following about the inspiration behind the cover art: "In this case the title helped quite a lot. I know that this is a somehow poetic quote and that they are not necessarily talking about a mountain, but we wanted something majestic and simple. That's also why we made it quite abstract. It's a picture of the mountain Kyrkja (the church) in Jotunheimen, Norway. Inside we have more images of Norwegian nature (in a collage style). But in general I guess the inspiration comes from the overall idea (production and songwriting/lyrics), rather than the album title."

== Reception ==
=== Critical reception ===
Professional ratings
Aggregate scores
Source	Rating
AnyDecentMusic?	5.9/10
Review scores
Source	Rating
AllMusic	3.5/5 stars
The Guardian	3/5 stars
musicOMH	2.5/5 stars
The Observer	3/5 stars
Planet Sound	8/10 stars
The Scotsman	2/5 stars
Times Online	4/5 stars

The Norwegian newspaper Verdens Gang gave the album 4 out of 6 stars, calling the band: "Coldplay's half-potent uncles." Dagbladet also gave it 4 out of 6, stating: "This is one of A-ha's best records, but it could have been a classic." Aftenposten was also very positive, giving it 4 out of 6, whilst Dagsavisen had slight reservations giving it 3 out of 6. Nettavisen also gave it 3 out of 6. Swedish newspaper Norra Västerbotten gave the album a glowing review and the mark 4 out of 5 stating that the album contained "Melodic synthpop in the vein of The Killers." Göteborgs-Posten gave the album 4 out of 6, calling the album: "A late peak in the band's career, perfectly placed between the soundscapes of Keane, Coldplay and Depeche Mode." Östgöta Correspondenten gave a favourable review stating: "It is clear to see where Coldplay get their inspiration from." Kristianstadsbladet were less favorable, stating that the album was a: "Sleeping pill." AllMusic's Jon O'Brien said the album "neatly brings [A-ha's] underrated career full circle by returning to the melodic electronica of their early glory days", and highlighted the "glorious OMD-esque 'Riding the Crest'" as "arguably their most infectious pop song since 1987 James Bond theme 'The Living Daylights'."

=== Commercial performance ===
In the United Kingdom, the album debuted at number five on the UK Albums Chart, the band's highest chart position since 1988. Foot of the Mountain reached platinum status in Russia, and in January 2010 it was certified platinum in Germany.

== Track listing ==
No.	Title	Lyrics	Music	Producer(s)	Length
1.	"The Bandstand"	Paul Waaktaar-Savoy	Magne Furuholmen, Waaktaar-Savoy	Mark Saunders	4:03
2.	"Riding the Crest"	Waaktaar-Savoy	Furuholmen, Waaktaar-Savoy	Steve Osborne, Erik Ljunggren, a-ha, Saunders^{[a]}	4:18
3.	"What There Is"	Waaktaar-Savoy	Furuholmen, Waaktaar-Savoy	Osborne, Ljunggren, a-ha, Saunders^{[a]}	3:46
4.	"Foot of the Mountain"	Furuholmen, Waaktaar-Savoy	Furuholmen, Waaktaar-Savoy, Martin Terefe	Roland Spremberg	3:59
5.	"Real Meaning"	Waaktaar-Savoy	Furuholmen, Waaktaar-Savoy	Osborne, Ljunggren, a-ha, Saunders^{[a]}	3:42
6.	"Shadowside"	Waaktaar-Savoy	Waaktaar-Savoy	Roland Spremberg	4:57
7.	"Nothing Is Keeping You Here"	Waaktaar-Savoy	Waaktaar-Savoy	Roland Spremberg	3:20
8.	"Mother Nature Goes To Heaven"	Waaktaar-Savoy	Waaktaar-Savoy	Roland Spremberg, Saunders^{[a]}	4:11
9.	"Sunny Mystery"	Furuholmen	Furuholmen	Osborne, Ljunggren, a-ha, Saunders^{[a]}	3:32
10.	"Start the Simulator"	Waaktaar-Savoy	Waaktaar-Savoy	Saunders, Spremberg	5:12

Japanese edition bonus tracks
No.	Title	Length
1.	"Foot of the Mountain (Remix)"	4:48
2.	"Foot of the Mountain (Erik Ljunggren Remix)"	4:51
3.	"Foot of the Mountain (Boheme 7" Remix)"	6:57

Notes

- ^{^[a]} contains elements produced by Mark Saunders

== Personnel ==
A-ha

- Morten Harket – vocals
- Magne Furuholmen – keyboards, vocals
- Paul Waaktaar-Savoy – guitars, vocals

Additional musicians

- Pete Davis – programming
- Erik Ljunggren – keyboards, programming
- Chris Papendieck – keyboards, programming, guitars
- Mark Saunders – programming
- Jochan Schmalbach – programming
- Roland Spremberg – keyboards, programming, guitars, bass guitar
- Albert Bjerglund – guitars
- Steve Osborne – guitars, bass guitar
- Jens Carstens – drums
- James Frazee – drums
- Karl Oluf Wennerberg – drums
- Kjetil Bjerkestrand – string arrangements
- Harald Aadland, Ida Bryhn, Bogumila Dowlasz-Wojcikowska, Dorthe Dreier, Øyvind Fossheim, Cecilia Götestam, Hans Josef Groh, Jørn Halbakken, Vegard Johnsen, Johannes Martens, André Orvik, Stig Ove Ose, Alyson Read, Eileen Siegel, and Hans Mortem Stensland – strings

Technical and Design

- Manfred Faust – engineer
- James Frazee – engineer
- Erik Ljunggren – engineer
- George Tanderø – engineer
- Jan Erik Kongshaug – string recording
- Robin Baynton – assistant engineer
- Adam Daniels – assistant engineer
- Steve Osborne – mixing
- Kevin Metcalfe – mastering
- Tim Young – mastering
- Metropolis Mastering and The Soundmasters (London, UK) – mastering locations
- Martin Kvamme – cover design
- Stian Andersen – photography
- Guy Berryman – photography
- Helge Kvamme – photography
- iStockphoto – photography
- Harald Wiik – management

== Charts ==
=== Weekly charts ===
Weekly chart performance for Foot of the Mountain
Chart (2009)	Peak position
Austrian Albums (Ö3 Austria)	11
Czech Albums (ČNS IFPI)	40
Dutch Albums (Album Top 100)	83
European Albums (Billboard)	8
German Albums (Offizielle Top 100)	1
Irish Albums (IRMA)	72
Italian Albums (FIMI)	85
Japanese Albums (Oricon)	134
Norwegian Albums (VG-lista)	2
Polish Albums (ZPAV)	17
Scottish Albums (Official Charts)	8
Swedish Albums (Sverigetopplistan)	45
Swiss Albums (Schweizer Hitparade)	12
UK Albums (Official Charts)	5

=== Year-end charts ===
Year-end chart performance for Foot of the Mountain
Chart (2009)	Position
European Albums (Billboard)	96
German Albums (Offizielle Top 100)	22

== Certifications ==
Certifications for Foot of the Mountain
Region	Certification	Certified units/sales
Germany (BVMI)	Platinum	200,000^{^}
Russia (NFPF)	Platinum	20,000^{*}
^{*} Sales figures based on certification alone.^{^} Shipments figures based on certification alone.

== Release history ==
Region	Date
Germany	12 June 2009
Poland	12 June 2009
Norway	15 June 2009
Netherlands	19 June 2009
Austria	19 June 2009
Switzerland	19 June 2009
UK	27 July 2009
Canada	18 August 2009
Brazil	27 October 2009
Japan	4 November 2009
Argentina	18 February 2010
