= Commandos (album) =

Studio album by Stage Dolls
- Released: June 1986
- Recorded: Late 1985 at Nidaros Studios in Trondheim
- Genre: Hard rock, AOR
- Length: 36:33
- Label: Grappa
- Producer: Bjørn Nessjø

Stage Dolls chronology
Soldier's Gun (1985)	Commandos (1986)	Stage Dolls (1988)

Professional ratings
Review scores
Source	Rating
Kerrang!	4/5 stars

Commandos is the second studio album by Norwegian hard rock band Stage Dolls, released in 1986 through Grappa Music (Norway) and in 1987 through Big Time Records (Europe, North America). The album charted for eleven weeks, peaking at #8 on the Norwegian album charts (VG) and making the band one of the most popular rock groups in Norway at the time. Thanks to the album's U.S. release, the band also gained attention outside of Norway, with the title track gaining considerable airplay on college radio.

== Track listing ==
All tracks are written by Torstein Flakne, except where noted

No.	Title	Length
1.	"Prelude"	00:15
2.	"Heart to Heart"	4:34
3.	"Commandos"	4:03
4.	"Yesterday's Rain"	4:35
5.	"Young Hearts"	4:16
6.	"Rock You" (lyrics: Erlend Antonsen, Terje Storli)	3:52
7.	"Magic"	3:55
8.	"Who's Lonely Now"	3:27
9.	"America"	3:48
10.	"Don't Look Back"	3:48
Total length:		36:33

== Personnel ==
- Torstein Flakne – vocals, guitar
- Brynjulf Blix – keyboard
- Steinar Krokstad – drums
- Terje Storli – bass
- Bjørn Nessjø – production
- Rune Nordahl – engineering
