= Nothing Is Keeping You Here =

Single by A-ha

from the album Foot of the Mountain
- Released: 20 September 2009
- Recorded: 2009
- Genre: New wave; pop rock
- Length: 3:04 (single mix); 3:21 (album version)
- Label: Universal Music; We Love Music
- Songwriter: Paul Waaktaar-Savoy
- Producer: Roland Spremberg

A-ha singles chronology
"Foot of the Mountain" (2009)	"Nothing Is Keeping You Here" (2009)	"Shadowside" (2009)

"Nothing Is Keeping You Here" is a song by the Norwegian synth-pop band a-ha taken from their ninth studio album Foot of the Mountain (2009). It was written by band member Paul Waaktaar-Savoy, produced by Roland Spremberg and it contains elements produced by Mark Saunders. It was released as the second single from the album in the United Kingdom on September 20, 2009, (whereas in mainland Europe "Shadowside" was used as the second single) and as the third single in Europe on 20 November 2009. In an interview in Norway, Waaktaar-Savoy stated that the track was the first song to be written for the album while on tour.

A pop song, "Nothing Is Keeping You Here" received a more electronic approach to it when it was released as a single. Its instrumentation consists in guitar, bass, drums and piano backbone. Lyrically, "Nothing Is Keeping You Here" has themes of transience and restlessness. It appeared on the soundtrack for the German feature film Zweiohrküken (2009) and its "original version" was included on the deluxe edition of the band's tenth studio album Cast in Steel (2015). The song received generally positive reviews from music critics, who went on to praise Morten Harket's vocal range on the track. It charted on German Singles Chart for four weeks, reaching number 65. Its accompanying music video was directed by German music director Uwe Flade.

== Background and release ==
After the success of the lead-single "Foot of the Mountain", "Nothing Is Keeping You Here" was selected to be the album's second single in the United Kingdom, whilst in mainland Europe "Shadowside" was released as the second single instead. In the United Kingdom, the digital single was released on 20 September 2009, including two versions of the song: the "UK radio edit" and the album's version. The UK "radio edit" was remixed by Steve Osbourne, and it rearranges much of the track's structure, moving the third verse to the beginning and mixing it within parts of the first verse, while its final chorus becomes the first chorus. The song was later released as the third single of the album in Germany on 20 November 2009. Its German-CD single features the "single edit", which was the version used in its music video and later on the band's compilation 25: The Very Best of a-ha (2010). The song was featured on the soundtrack for the German feature film Zweiohrküken (Rabbit Without Ears 2) (2009). A slow-version of the song entitled "original version", which can be also interpreted as the demo version, became available on the deluxe edition of a-ha's tenth studio album Cast in Steel (2015).

== Composition and lyrics ==
"Nothing Is Keeping You Here" was written by band member Paul Waaktaar-Savoy, who wrote its words and music, while production was done by Roland Spremberg. It also contains elements produced by Mark Saunders. In an interview with Magnus S. Rønningen of the Norwegian website Massiv.no, Waaktaar-Savoy claimed that the song was the first song to be written for the album during the band's tour in 2008. It was considered one of the most traditional pop songs on the album, with instrumentation consisting in guitar, bass, drums and piano backbone. It opens with a guitar riff, followed by the band's formula of "relaxed" verse and "rousing/interesting" chorus. Lyrically, it deals with themes of transience and restlessness, with Morten Harket singing in one of the chorus, "And everybody talks/And everybody stares/It’s safe to say that/Nothing is keeping you here."

== Critical reception ==
The song received positive reviews from most music critics. Alex Young of Consequence of Sound considered "nostalgic" and praised the band's vocalist, Morten Harket, calling him "an exceptional vocalist, and he thankfully displays his somber and surreal range on this record. 'Nothing Is Keeping You Here' presents Harket effortlessly covering broad sound without becoming a total braggart." Chris Gerard of PopMatters praised the track, calling it "brilliant", while Chi Ming Lai of The Electricity Club noted that the song "captured the combination of heartfelt melancholy and emotive melodies that A-HA have always done best." Lai also called the single version an electronic "pièce de résistance". Nikk Gunns of Get Ready to Rock gave the song a rating of 3 stars, remarking that "the album version has a sparser feel to it, the single has been re-mixed to sound more like the band’s earlier hits - a good idea as [...] the current nostalgia for all things ‘80’s will have no doubt been taken into consideration. The track itself is 3 minutes of easy to listen to pop that features all the hallmarks that you would expect from an A-Ha single." In a more mixed review, the website The Scotsman wrote that the song sounds "as tentative and middle-of-the-road as the rest of the album." In a similar mode, Mayer Nassim wrote for Digital Spy that the song "lack[s] the oomph needed to elevate them from the realms of the ordinary and at times the melodies drift dangerously close to the middle of the road."

== Music video ==
The music video was shot in Germany by director Uwe Flade and was made commercially available on a German special edition of Foot of the Mountain (2009). It is set to the European radio/single version of the song.

== Track listing ==
=== German Physical Release ===
1. "Nothing Is Keeping You Here" (Single Edit) - 3:04
2. "Nothing Is Keeping You Here" (Steve Osborne Remix) - 3:21

=== UK Download Release ===
1. "Nothing Is Keeping You Here" (Radio Edit)* - 3:21
2. "Nothing Is Keeping You Here" (Album Version) - 3:17

== Chart performance ==
"Nothing Is Keeping You Here" charted on the German Singles Chart, reaching a peak of number sixty-five, while remaining for four weeks on the chart, starting 14 December 2009 and ending 10 January 2010.

Chart (2009)	Peak position
Germany (GfK)	65
