= Out of My Hands (Morten Harket album) =

Studio album by Morten Harket
- Released: 13 April 2012
- Recorded: Ljunggren Studio, Snowdrop Studios (Norway); Real World Studios (England); Studio Brun, Quant Studios (Sweden)
- Genres: Synthpop; pop rock
- Length: 37:44
- Labels: Universal; Island; We Love Music
- Producers: Morten Harket; Lars Hustoft; Peter Kvint; Erik Ljunggren; Steve Osborne; Jonas Quant

Morten Harket chronology
Letter from Egypt (2008)	Out of My Hands (2012)	Brother (2014)

Singles from Out of My Hands
- 1. "Lightning" Released: 9 March 2012; 2. "Scared of Heights" Released: 27 March 2012; 3. "I'm the One" Released: 23 November 2012

Singles from Out of My Hands (UK)
- 1. "Scared of Heights" Released: 14 May 2012; 2. "I'm the One" Released: 9 July 2012; 3. "Burn Money Burn" Released: 29 October 2012

Out of My Hands is the fifth studio album and third English-language album by Norwegian pop singer Morten Harket. It was released on 13 April 2012 through Island Records. The album was mainly produced by British record producer Steve Osborne, who worked with a-ha on their ninth studio album, Foot of the Mountain (2009). The album charted at number one in Norway, becoming the singer's third number-one album there.

== Critical reception ==
Professional ratings
Review scores
Source	Rating
Adresseavisen	3/6 stars
Aftenposten	4/6 stars
Dagbladet	3/6 stars
Dagsavisen	3/6 stars
Drammens Tidende	3/6 stars
Fædrelandsvennen	4/6 stars
Hamar Arbeiderblad	3/6 stars
Nordlys	negative
Verdens Gang	3/6 stars

Nick Levine of the BBC gave the album a favourable review, and wrote: "There's a similar dignity to Morten Harket's first solo album since the split. It's a grown-up synth-pop affair featuring songs that vary in pace all the way from a fairly slow mid-tempo to, ooh, a fairly fast mid-tempo. Actually, Out of My Hands doesn't sound too different from the last few a-ha albums, but it's also fresh enough to recall Echoes, Will Young's stellar electro-pop LP from last year."

In his review for Daily Express, Simon Gage gave the album three out of five stars writing, "The famous falsetto is still very much in evidence and the songs strong if a little on the dated side with driving guitars and lush orchestrations making it sound remarkably a-ha-esque."

== Track listing ==
No.	Title	Lyrics	Music	Producer(s)	Length
1.	"Scared of Heights"	Espen Lind	Lind	Erik Ljunggren	3:22
2.	"Keep the Sun Away"	David Sneddon, James Bauer-Mein, Julian Peake	Sneddon, Bauer-Mein, Peake	Steve Osborne, Ljunggren	3:19
3.	"Lightning"	Joakim Berg, Martin Sköld, Morten Harket	Berg, Sköld, Harket	Osborne, Erik Ljunggren	3:52
4.	"I'm the One"	Ole Sverre Olsen, Harket	Harket, Peter Kvint	Ljunggren, Kvint	3:22
5.	"Quiet"	Olsen, Harket	Harket, Kvint	Kvint, Harket	4:19
6.	"Burn Money Burn"	Berg, Harket^{[a]}	Berg	Ljunggren, Osborne	3:52
7.	"When I Reached the Moon"	Håvard Rem	Harket, Kvint	Osborne	3:50
8.	"Listening"	Neil Tennant	Tennant, Chris Lowe	Osborne	4:53
9.	"Just Believe It"	Olsen, Berg, Harket	Berg, Jonas Quant	Jonas Quant	3:28
10.	"Out of My Hands"	Harket, Olsen	Harket, Lars K. Hustoft	Hustoft, Harket, Kvint	3:37

German, France and UK bonus track
No.	Title	Writer(s)	Length
11.	"Undecided"	Hågen Rørmark, Christian Engebretsen, Tor Einar Krogtoft-Jensen	3:33

Notes

- ^{^[a]} Original Swedish lyrics by Joakim Berg, English lyrics by Morten Harket.

== Charts ==
Chart (2012)	Peak position
Austrian Albums Chart	30
Belgian Albums Chart (Wallonia)	90
Dutch Albums Chart	77
French Albums Chart	29
German Albums Chart	3
Norwegian Albums Chart	1
Russian Albums Chart	18
Swiss Albums Chart	23
UK Albums Chart	37

== Release history ==
Region	Date	Format(s)	Label
Austria	April 13, 2012	CD, digital download	Universal Music Group, Island Records, We Love Music
Belgium	April 13, 2012	CD, digital download	Universal Music Group, Island Records, We Love Music
France	April 13, 2012	CD, digital download	Universal Music Group, Island Records, We Love Music
Germany	April 13, 2012	CD, digital download	Universal Music Group, Island Records, We Love Music
Netherlands	April 13, 2012	CD, digital download	Universal Music Group, Island Records, We Love Music
Switzerland		CD, digital download	Universal Music Group, Island Records, We Love Music
United Kingdom	May 14, 2012	CD, digital download	Wrasse Records
