= Stage Dolls (album) =

Studio album by Stage Dolls
- Released: 1988 in Europe; June 28, 1989 in America (Vinyl); July 5, 1989 in America (CD & Cassette); December 21, 1989 in Japan
- Recorded: NBL Studios, Trondheim, Norway
- Genre: Arena rock, hard rock, pop rock
- Length: 33:54
- Label: Polydor (Europe); Chrysalis (America)
- Producer: Bjørn Nessjø (Necessary Productions)

Stage Dolls chronology
Commandos (1986)	Stage Dolls (1988)	Stripped (1991)

Stage Dolls is the third studio album by Norwegian hard rock band Stage Dolls. Like the first two albums, it was also recorded in Trondheim, Norway, using the same producer, Bjørn Nessjø, and engineer, Rune Nordahl.

The album was released in the United States in 1989 by Chrysalis Records, Inc. The single "Love Cries" went to number 46 on the Billboard Singles Charts, and "Wings of Steel" went to number 10 in Norway. The album itself peaked at number 3 on the album charts in Norway. It was certified gold disc in Norway.

== Track listing ==
All music written by Torstein Flakne, all lyrics written by Flakne/ B. Icon, except where noted.

1. "Still in Love" – 4:18
2. "Wings of Steel" – 3:28
3. "Lorraine" – 3:20
4. "Waitin' for You" (T. Flakne, B. Icon) – 3:51
5. "Love Cries" – 4:11
6. "Mystery" – 3:21
7. "Don't Stop Believin'" – 4:22
8. "Hanoi Waters" – 3:22
9. "Ammunition" – 3:26

== Personnel ==
=== Band ===
- Torstein Flakne – guitars, vocals
- Steinar Krokstad – drums
- Terje Storli – bass

=== Additional personnel ===
- Kjetil Bjerkestrand – keyboards and Fairlight programming
- Vaneese Thomas - background vocals
- Angela Clemmons - background vocals
- Benny Diggs - background vocals
- Fonzie Thornton - background vocals
- Phil Ballou - background vocals
- Darryl Tookes - background vocals
- Ronni Le Tekrø - Guitar on "Mystery"

== Album credits ==
- Bjørn Nessjø – producer
- Rune Nordahl – engineer

== Certifications ==
Region	Certification	Certified units/sales
Norway (IFPI Norway)	Gold	50,000
