= Håvard Rem =

Norwegian poet (born 1959)

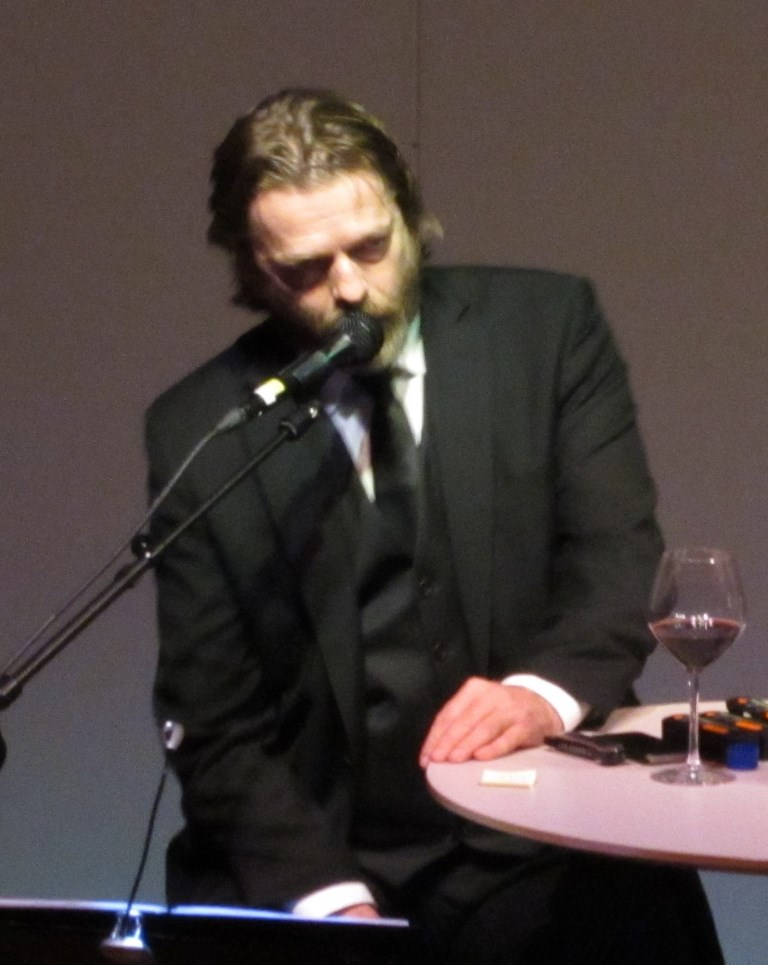
Håvard Rem

Håvard Rem (born 7 February 1959, Oslo) is a Norwegian poet.

== Lyrics and poetry ==
Rem made his book debut in 1977 with Kall på heltene, a collection of poetry. His Selected Poems has been published in Norwegian (1996), Arabic (2000), Russian (2002), Italian (2011) and Japanese (2015). Rem's poetry and song lyrics have been used by artists and bands such as Gulli Briem (Mezzoforte), Gisle Kverndokk, a-ha, Morten Harket, Kaizers Orchestra, Vamp, Jørn Hoel, and Silje Nergaard.

== Non-fiction and biographies ==
Rem has written biographies of Bob Dylan, Erik Mykland, Aril Edvardsen, Tor Erling Staff and Bjarte Baasland. He has also written books about his travels in Europe, Africa, Asia and the Middle East.

== Interpreting and translations ==
Rem has interpreted texts by Bob Dylan, Walt Whitman, Derek Walcott and Leonard Cohen. He has also translated and worked on texts by William Shakespeare.

== Publications ==
Non-fiction (books)

- Den femfotete kamel: Artikler om poesi (1991)
- Bob Dylan: en monografi (1999)
- Himmelsk: Mat og mirakler i Midtøsten (photo: Knut Bry) (1999)
- Erik Mykland: oppvekst, livsstil, European Championship 2000, player-style (2000)
- Blå (ill.: Kjell Nupen, photo: Knut Bry) (2002)
- Søren Kierkegaard (2002)
- Aril Edvardsen: et selvopplevd portrett (2004)
- Staff (2005) (About the lawyer Tor Erling Staff)
- Fred. Reise etter krig (photo: Marcel Lelïenhof) (2006)
- Togreiser (2009)
- Peter Pilný: Historien om Bjarte Baasland (2009)
- Innfødte skrik: norsk svartmetall (2010)
- Forbyttet (2010)

Poetry (books)

- Kall på heltene : lyrics (1977)
- Bruddstedet : lyrics (1978)
- Sist jeg løp på deg : verse (1981)
- Et lykkelig år av min ungdom : verse and stories (1982)
- Bak dør på gløtt : lyrics (1985)
- Karl Johans åpenbaring : lyrics (1987)
- Galgeland : lyrics (1991)
- Øvelser i grensesetting : lyrics 1413 1993 5754 (1993)
- Taksameteret går Collected lyrics 1977–1996 (1996)
- Dvergmål Et rytmisk dikt (1999)
- Tekstmeldinger : dikt (2000)
- Selected Poems : arabisk utgave (Damaskus, Marrakech, 2000)
- Selected Poems : russisk utgave (Moskva, 2002)
- Selected Poems : italiensk utave (Roma, 2011)
- 30 40 50 : poems (2012)

Music texts

- Poetenes Evangelium (music: Øivind Varkøy, vocals: Morten Harket) (1993)
- Wild Seed (music/vocals: Morten Harket) (1995)
- Kom ut og lek (vocals: Steinar Albrigtsen, Jørn Hoel, Magnus Grønneberg, Morten Harket) (1995)
- Begå Ænesen En Æ'ndals-ræpp (music: Bjørn Jørgensen) (1996)
- Vogts Villa (music/vocals: Morten Harket) (1996)

Drama (books)

- Jødenes konge : a Christmas play (1991)

Drama (plays)

- Jødenes konge: Et julespill (Agder Teater, 1991)
- Stor-Rones: Et spill om Kjeøya (1992)
- Messias-monologene I-III (Den Nationale Scene, 1999–2001)

Fiction (books)

- Tvillingbrødrene Et eventyr (1995)

=== Interpretations and translations ===
Non-fiction (books)

- Seier gjennom lovsang by Merlin Carothers (1980)
- Videre med Herren by Bob Mumford (1980)
- Gåten Knut Hamsun by Robert Ferguson (1990)
- Seidelin gjenforteller Bibelen by Ann Elisabeth Seidelin (1992)
- Vannmerke by Josef Brodskij (1993)

Poetry (books)

- Tilegnet den usynlige verden Walt Whitman (s.m. Kurt Narvesen) (1984)
- Kjærlighet og hat: Et utvalg Leonard Cohen (1988)
- Slavenes energi Leonard Cohen (1989)

Poetry (albums)

- Hadde månen en søster: Leonard Cohen på norsk (vocals: Kari Bremnes, Sidsel Endresen, Claudia Scott, Somebody's Darling, Kirsten Bråten Berg, Kristin Solli) (1993)
- Aleine om høsten Hank Williams på norsk (vocals: Vibeke Saugestad, Jonas Fjeld, Gunn Heidi Larsen, Sondre Bratland) (1995)
- Fredløs: Bob Dylan på norsk (vocals: Åge Aleksandersen) (1997)
- Flux: William Shakespeare på norsk (vocals: Elisabeth Karsten) (1999)

Drama (books)

- Ekte Dylan by Sam Shepard (Arken, 1988)
- Det siste karneval by Derek Walcott (Solum, 1995)

Drama (plays)

- Cyrano de Bergerac by Edmond Rostand (s.m. Pål Løkkeberg and Torstein Bugge Høverstad) (Trøndelag teater, 1984)
- Hamlet by William Shakespeare (Rogaland teater, 1986)
- Romeo and Juliet by William Shakespeare (Rogaland teater, 1986; Den Nationale Scene, 1999; Riksteatret, 2003; Nationaltheatret, 2010)
- Ham Hamlet by William Shakespeare/Poul Borum (NRK Ungdomsteatret, 1988)
- En god dør trenger ingen lås by Morten Jansson (NRK Ungdomsteatret, 1989)
- Så lenge smerten er usynlig by Dorrit Willumsen (NRK Radioteatret, 1994)
- Satans kvinnfolk by Benedicte Adrian/Ingrid Bjørnov (Holmenkollen, 1994)
- Rent: En rock-opera by Jonathan Larson (Trøndelag teater, 1999)
- Spring Awakening (Oslo Nye, 2010; Trøndelag teater, 2010)

Editing

- I korthet: Atten norske aforistikere (1986)
- Samtaler med Jens Bjørneboe 1951–1976 (1987)
- Poetenes evangelium Jesu liv i norske dikt (ill.: Bjørn Bjørneboe) (1991)
- Mann! Bibelske mannsbilder (photo: Morten Krogvold) (2000)
- 100 dikt om krig (2003)
- Tingene er dine øyne / Tingene er dine øjne / Tingene er dine ögon Skandinaviske dikt og sangtekster 1600–2000 (2009)

== Prizes ==
- Cappelen Prize (1987) for Karl Johans åpenbaring
- Aust-Agder fylkes kulturpris (1993)
- Kultur- og kirkedepartementets pris for barne- og ungdomslitteratur Illustrated book prize (1995) for Tvillingbrødrene (s. m. Harald Nordberg)
- Record of the year Spellemannprisen 1995 "A Kind of Christmas Card" (with Morten Harket)
