= Foot of the Mountain (song) =

Single by A-ha

from the album Foot of the Mountain
- Released: 5 May 2009
- Recorded: May 2009
- Genre: Synth-pop; new wave
- Length: 3:57
- Label: Universal; We Love Music
- Songwriters: Paul Waaktaar-Savoy; Magne Furuholmen; Martin Terefe
- Producer: Roland Spremberg

A-ha singles chronology
| "Cosy Prisons" (2006) | "Foot of the Mountain" (2009) | "Nothing Is Keeping You Here" (2009) |

Music video
- "Foot of the Mountain" on YouTube

"Foot of the Mountain" is a song by Norwegian synth-pop band A-ha, released as the lead single from their ninth studio album of the same name (2009). It was used as the official anthem of the 2009 World Championships in Athletics held in Berlin. The single reached number three in Germany, the band's highest-charting single in that country since "Take On Me" in 1985.

"Foot of the Mountain" was the most played song on Norwegian radio in 2009, with 122 hours, 32 minutes and 39 seconds of playing time, marking the first time a Norwegian artist has topped the list.

== Release ==
"Foot of the Mountain", was released exclusively as a download single in select territories of mainland Europe. In Germany, a physical two-track CD single was released. In the United Kingdom, a digital bundle was released.

== Promotion ==
In May 2009, the band performed the song on the show Germany's Next Top Model hosted by Heidi Klum and on The Dome alongside fellow Norwegian Alexander Rybak. On 11 June 2009 at 8:13 CEST the music video premiered simultaneously on four major German networks, namely ProSieben, Sat.1, kabel eins, and N24. It was also made available for streaming on the major German website Myvideo.de.

== Music video ==
The music video for the track, co-directed by Olaf Heine and Mik Rahner, was shot in Berlin, Hamburg and along the Baltic coast of Pomerania. The video centers on singer Morten Harket, with brief cameo appearances by Paul Waaktaar-Savoy and Magne Furuholmen. In the documentary A-ha: The Success Story, songwriter Waaktaar-Savoy stated that although he loved living in New York, he "often wondered whether I would be happier out in the open, by the foot of the mountain", when asked about the song's chorus. In the same interview, co-writer Furuholmen said his contribution to the song, the verses, were about "urban clutter". In the video, these angles are made a point of as Harket moves from a claustrophobic Berlin to the open landscapes of Pomerania. The video was made commercially available in Germany on a special edition of the Foot of the Mountain album.

== Track listings ==
- German 2-track CD single
1. "Foot of the Mountain" (Radio Edit) – 3:44
2. "Foot of the Mountain" (Album Version) – 3:57
- UK digital bundle
1. "Foot of the Mountain" (Radio Edit)
2. "Foot of the Mountain" (Album Edit)
3. "Foot of the Mountain" (Bohème7 Remix)
4. "Foot of the Mountain" (Erik Ljunggren Remix)
5. "Foot of the Mountain" (Video)

== Charts ==
=== Weekly charts ===
Weekly chart performance for "Foot of the Mountain"
| Chart (2009) | Peak position |
|---|---|
| Austria (Ö3 Austria Top 40) | 28 |
| Germany (GfK) | 3 |
| Iceland (LagaListinn Topp 20) | 10 |
| Norway (VG-lista) | 8 |
| Switzerland (Schweizer Hitparade) | 33 |
| UK Singles (Official Charts) | 66 |

=== Year-end charts ===
Year-end chart performance for "Foot of the Mountain"
| Chart (2009) | Position |
|---|---|
| Germany (Official German Charts) | 41 |

== Certifications ==
| Region | Certification | Certified units/sales |
|---|---|---|
| Germany (BVMI) | Gold | 150,000^{‡} |
^{‡} Sales+streaming figures based on certification alone.

== MTV Unplugged appearance ==
In 2017, A-ha appeared on the television series MTV Unplugged and played and recorded acoustic versions of many of their popular songs for the album MTV Unplugged – Summer Solstice in Giske, Norway, including "Foot of the Mountain".
