= Soldier's Gun =

1985 album by Stage Dolls

Studio album by Stage Dolls
- Released: 1985
- Recorded: Fall 1984, Nidaros Studios, Trondheim, Norway
- Genre: Hard rock
- Length: 34:00 min
- Labels: PolyGram, 824 553-2
- Producer: Bjørn Nessjø

Stage Dolls chronology
Soldier's Gun (1985)	Commandos (1986)

Professional ratings
Review scores
Source	Rating
Metal Forces	60/100

Soldier's Gun is the first studio album by the Norwegian hard rock band Stage Dolls. The album was recorded in the fall of 1984 at Nidaros Studios in Trondheim, Norway with the same producer, Bjørn Nessjø, and engineer, Rune Nordahl, as fellow Trondheim hard-rockers TNT. The album was released in the early winter of 1985 after a successful nationwide tour in Norway supporting the same TNT. Soldier's Gun barely made it onto the Norwegian album chart (VG) for one week as number 20. The album sold in excess of 20,000 copies in Norway.

== Track listing ==
1. "Queen of Hearts" – 3:09
2. "Soldier's Gun" – 4:04
3. "Ten Tons" – 3:34
4. "While the Bombs are Falling" – 2:30
5. "Tonight" – 4:03
6. "Left Foot Boogie" – 3:27
7. "Way of the World" – 2:32
8. "Red Rose" – 2:21
9. "Photograph" – 4:40
10. "Shout" – 3:41

== Personnel ==
- Torstein Flakne - lead vocals, rhythm and lead guitar
- Terje Storli - bass, backing vocals
- Erlend Antonsen - drums, percussion
