= Darkspace =

Darkspace usually refers to the intergalactic void that exists between celestial galaxies.

It may refer to:

- DarkSpace, a computer game
- Darkspace, a Swiss ambient black metal band
- "Darkspace", a song by Morten Harket from Letter from Egypt
- "Darkspace", a short story by Robert F. Young
- Dark Space, a 2013 film
- Dark Space, a role-playing game supplement for Space Master by Monte Cook, published by Iron Crown Enterprises
