= Shadowside (song) =

Single by A-ha

from the album Foot of the Mountain
- Released: September 21, 2009 (EU); November 16, 2009 (UK)
- Recorded: 2009
- Genre: New wave, alternative rock
- Length: 3:31 (single); 4:54 (album)
- Label: Universal Music, We Love Music
- Songwriter: Paul Waaktaar-Savoy
- Producers: Martin Terefe & Roland Spremberg, A-ha

A-ha singles chronology
"Nothing Is Keeping You Here" (2009)	"Shadowside" (2009)	"Butterfly, Butterfly (The Last Hurrah)" (2010)

"Shadowside" is a single from the A-ha album Foot of the Mountain. It was released as the third single from the album in the UK and as the second single in Europe (where "Nothing Is Keeping You Here" was the third single). The German physical release of the single includes a demo of the album track "Mother Nature Goes to Heaven".

== Track listing ==
=== German physical release ===
1. "Shadowside" (New Single Version) - 3:31
2. "Mother Nature Goes to Heaven" (Demo Version) - 4:34

=== UK download release ===
1. "Shadowside" (New Single Version) - 3:31
2. "Shadowside" (Album Version) - 4:54

== Chart positions ==
- #22 (GER)
- #73 (AUT)
- #86 (EU)
- #98 (UN)

== Music video ==
The music video was shot in Germany by director Uwe Flade and made commercially available on a German special edition of Foot of the Mountain.
