= Brother (Morten Harket album) =

Studio album by Morten Harket
- Released: 11 April 2014
- Recorded: 2013–2014
- Studio: Studio Brun and Atlantis Studios, Stockholm, Sweden
- Genre: Pop rock
- Length: 37.02
- Label: Universal (Scandinavia); Wrasse (UK/Ireland); Starwatch (rest of Europe)
- Producer: Peter Kvint, Morten Harket

Morten Harket chronology
| Out of My Hands (2012) | Brother (2014) |

Singles from Brother
- 1. "There Is a Place" Released: 29 November 2013; 2. "Brother" Released: 18 January 2014; 3. "Do You Remember Me?" Released: 12 May 2014

Professional ratings
Review scores
| Source | Rating |
|---|---|
| Adresseavisen | 4/6 stars |
| Aftenposten | 5/6 stars |
| Bergensavisen | 4/6 stars |
| Bergens Tidende | 4/6 stars |
| Dagbladet | 3/6 stars |
| Dagsavisen | 3/6 stars |
| Drammens Tidende | 4/6 stars |
| Verdens Gang | 3/6 stars |
| Østlendingen | 5/6 stars |

Brother is the sixth studio album and fourth English-language album by Norwegian singer & A-Ha lead vocalist Morten Harket. It was released on 11 April 2014 through Universal Music. "There Is a Place" was released as the album's first single on 29 November 2013. On 18 January 2014, "Brother" was released as the second single. It was premiered the same day at the Norwegian award show, Spellemannprisen. The song was inspired by the Radical, the memoir of British Islamist-turned-Liberal activist Maajid Nawaz. It was featured as the Album of the Week on the Ken Bruce Show on BBC Radio 2 from 21 to 25 April 2014. The music video for the song "Brother" was directed by long-time friend and Hollywood director Harald Zwart.

== Track listing ==
- All music written by Morten Harket and Peter Kvint. All lyrics written by Morten Harket and Ole Sverre Olsen, with additional words by Peter Kvint, except "First Man to the Grave", music and lyrics written by Ole Sverre Olsen.

| No. | Title | Length |
|---|---|---|
| 1. | "Brother" | 4:31 |
| 2. | "Do You Remember Me?" | 4:04 |
| 3. | "Safe with Me" | 3:27 |
| 4. | "Whispering Heart" | 3:56 |
| 5. | "Heaven Cast" | 4:07 |
| 6. | "There Is a Place" | 3:15 |
| 7. | "Oh What a Night" | 3:41 |
| 8. | "End of the Line" | 3:36 |
| 9. | "Can't Answer This" | 3:36 |
| 10. | "First Man to the Grave" | 3:39 |

== Personnel ==
- Morten Harket – producer, instruments, vocals
- Peter Kvint – producer, recording, mixer, instruments, backing vocals
- Janne Hansson – strings, drums and organ recording
- Simon Nordberg – additional mixing (track 1)
- Tom Coyne – mastering
- Aya Merill – mastering
- Joakim Milder – strings arranger and conductor
- Per Lindvall – drums
- Jesper Nordenström – piano, organ
- Björn Risberg – cello

== Charts ==
Chart performance for Brother
| Chart (2014) | Peak position |
|---|---|
| German Albums (Offizielle Top 100) | 11 |
| Norwegian Albums (VG-lista) | 1 |
| Scottish Albums (OCC) | 91 |
| Swiss Albums (Schweizer Hitparade) | 62 |
| UK Albums (OCC) | 56 |
| UK Independent Albums (OCC) | 8 |
