= The Kids (Norwegian band) =

Norwegian rock band

- Origin: Trondheim, Norway
- Genres: Rock; hard rock; glam rock
- Years active: 1979–1982, 1996, 2007
- Labels: Sony BMG
- Website: thekids.no

The Kids was a Norwegian rock band from Trondheim, formed in 1979. Their best known song is Hun Er Forelska i lærer'n ("She's In Love With the Teacher"), in 1980. Norske jenter ("Norwegian Girls") is another hit. The band released music in Sweden with Swedish language versions of the songs.

The Kids became known for their platinum blonde hair, and were the first in Norway to produce a music video. The video was aired by Zikk Zakk, the only rock music program on NRK. The Kids sold to platinum. After the band broke up, Dag Ingebrigtsen took part in the founding of TNT. Meanwhile, Torstein Flakne founded Stage Dolls. They had a reunion tour in 1996, and released a greatest hits album in the same year.

== Last lineup ==
- Dag Ingebrigtsen – vocals (1979–1981)
- Torstein Flakne – piano, guitar, backing vocals (1979–1981)
- Svein Morten Lunde – bass (1979–1981) (died 1996)
- Ragnar Vigdal – drums (1979–1981)
- Arild Samstad – keyboards (1979–1981)

== Discography ==
- Norske jenter ("Norwegian Girls") (1980)
- Sønner av Norge ("Sons of Norway") (1981)
- Sønner av Norske Jenter/Greatest Hits (1996)
- Hits fra Kids (2007)

== Known hits ==
- "Hun er forelska i lærer'n" (1980), certified Platinum in Norway in 2021.
- "Vil du værra me mæ hjæm i natt" (1996), certified Platinum in Norway in 2021.
