= Norske Jenter =

Studio album by The Kids
- Released: 1980
- Studio: Nidaros Studio
- Genre: Rock
- Label: CBS
- Producer: The Kids, Kristian Lindeman

The Kids chronology
Norske Jenter (1980)	Sønner av Norge (1981)

Norske Jenter (Norwegian Girls) is the debut album of the Norwegian rock-band The Kids.

== Tracklist ==
1. "Norske jenter"
2. "Nye klær"
3. "Fanklubb"
4. "Rock n Roll"
5. "The Kids er ålreit"
6. "Cool"
7. "Forelska i lærern"
8. "Null"
9. "Gaterock"
10. "Superstar"
11. "Ensom "
12. "En liten pike"

== Certifications ==
Region	Certification	Certified units/sales
Norway (IFPI Norway)	Platinum	100,000
