= Jens Carstens =

German drummer (born 1971)

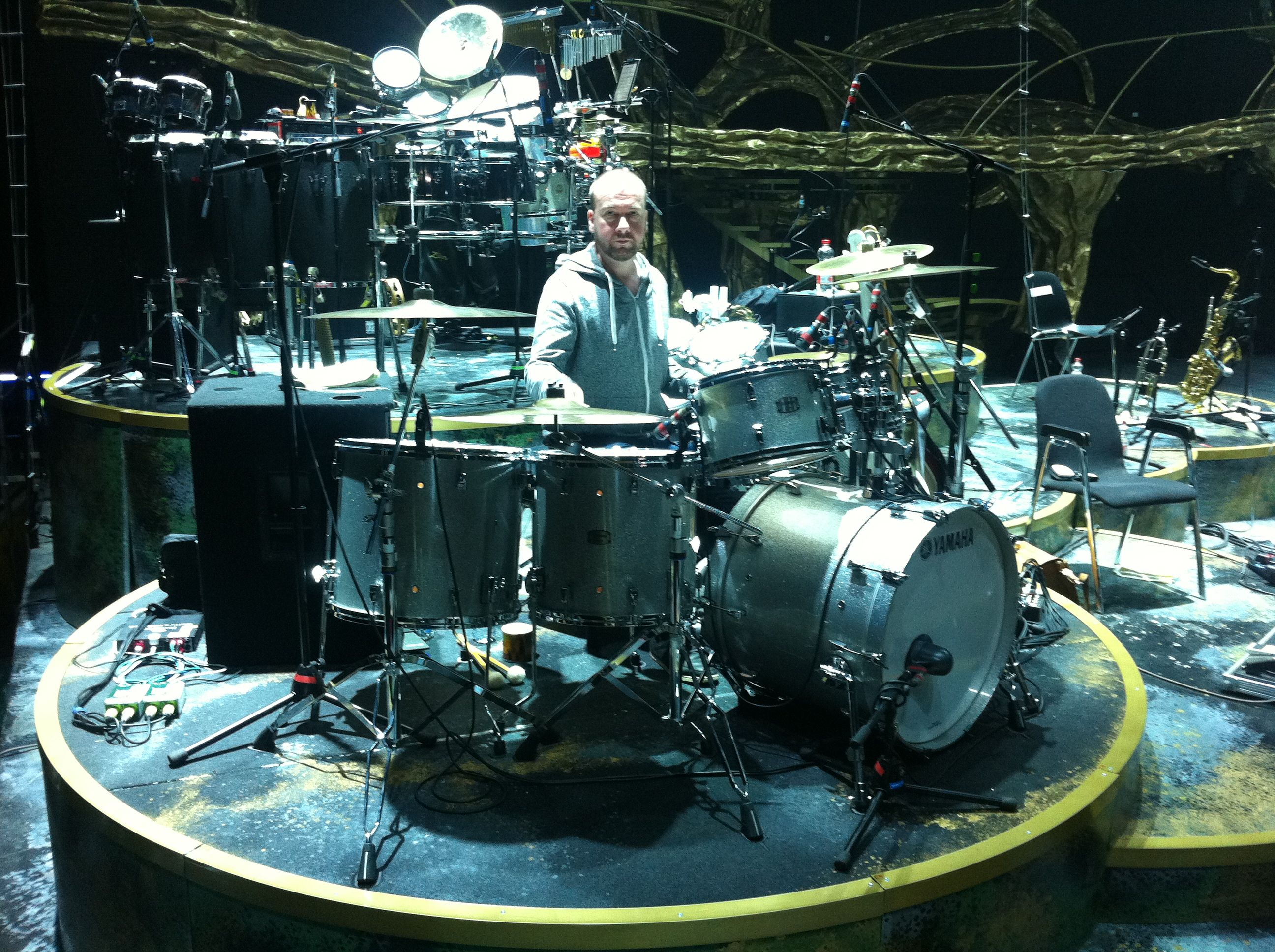

Background information
- Born: April 29, 1971 (age 54); Radevormwald, Germany
- Instrument: Drums
- Years active: 1991–present

Jens Carstens (born 29 April 1971) is a German drummer, composer, producer, and children's book author.

== Biography ==
Carstens was born in Radevormwald. He began playing drums and piano at the age of seven. Later he studied popular music at the Hochschule für Musik und Theater Hamburg. In 1991, Carstens was a founding member of the band Public Park in which guitarist Jörg Sander also played. From 1994 the band was under contract with Sony Music and was produced by Franz Plasa. Between 1992 and 2000 he was also the drummer of the band Yellowide (formerly Disco). In addition to his work as a drummer, Carstens is also active as a composer and producer in rock and pop music. Among others, he worked for and with a-ha, Patricia Kaas, The Ten Tenors, Roger Whittaker, Tony Christie, Lukas Loules, Helene Fischer, Kira, Howard Carpendale, Selig, Heinz Rudolf Kunze, Rosenstolz, Rolf Zuckowski, and Udo Lindenberg.

Together with Heinz Rudolf Kunze Carstens published the children's book Quentin Qualle – Die Muräne hat Migräne (Quentin Qualle – The moray eel has migraine) in June 2014. He also worked as a composer and co-producer for the eponymous radio play. In January 2015, the second volume Quentin Qualle – Rock am Riff (Quentin Qualle – Rock at the reef) was published; in addition to the book text he also wrote the songs and produced the music. The third volume was published in summer 2015 with the title Quentin Qualle – Halligalli bei Zirkus Koralli (Quentin Qualle – Halligalli with circus Koralli).

Carstens lives in Wedel (Schleswig-Holstein) with his wife and daughter.

== Selected works ==
=== Drum recordings ===
- Udo Lindenberg – "Und ewig rauscht die Linde" (album)
- a-ha – "Foot of the Mountain" (album)
- Selig – "Ohne Dich", "Sie hat geschrien", "Wenn ich wollte" (singles)
- Jan Plewka – "Zuhause da war ich schon" (album)
- Heinz Rudolf Kunze – various albums since 2002
- Rosenstolz – "Die Suche geht weiter" (album)
- The Ten Tenors – "Larger than Life" (album)

=== Live musician ===
- 2002–2009: Rosenstolz
- 2002–today: Heinz Rudolf Kunze
- 2010–today: Helene Fischer

=== Composer ===
- For Heinz Rudolf Kunze: various songs, including "Hallo Himmel", "Das Glück an Deiner Seite", "Unbeliebt", "Einmal noch und immer wieder", "Das Paradies ist hier"
- For Truck Stop: "Einfach mal nicht tun"
- For Alexander Klaws: "Sie liebt Dich"
- With Jan Sievers: various songs
- Music for the children's book Quentin Qualle

=== Producer ===
- With Jan Sievers: "Abgeliebt" (album)
- With Heinz Rudolf Kunze: "Stein vom Herzen" and "Deutschland" (albums)

=== Author ===
Co-authored with Heinz Rudolf Kunze:

- Quentin Qualle – Die Muräne hat Migräne
- Quentin Qualle – Rock am Riff
- Quentin Qualle – Halligalli bei Zirkus Koralli
