= Kurt Narvesen =

Norwegian poet and translator

- Born: 21 October 1948; Arendal, Norway
- Died: 9 May 2024 (aged 75); Oslo
- Occupations: Poet and translator

Kurt Narvesen (21 October 1948 – 9 May 2024) was a Norwegian poet and translator.

== Personal life ==
Narvesen was born in Arendal on 21 October 1948.

He died in Oslo on 9 May 2024.

== Career ==
Narvesen made his literary debut in 1975, with the poetry collection Steppene, where he asks questions such as "What age am I from / where am I going / which star is my next beginning?" Further collections are Ararat (1976), Til Vannmannens terskel (1977), and Smil, Sinbad! (1979), reporting from his travels to places like Switzerland, Caucasus and Crete. His collections from the 1980s include Gjenkomst i mai (1982), Ved bredden (1985), and Favntak (1990).

His collection Blomsterelskeren og andre gjendiktninger fra amerikansk og engelsk poesi from 1981 is a collection of translated American and English poetry. He issued a translation of poetry by Walt Whitman into Norwegian language in 1984 (titled Tilegnet den usynlige verden), in collaboration with Håvard Rem.
