= A Kind of Christmas Card =

1995 single by Morten Harket

Single by Morten Harket

from the album Wild Seed
- B-side: "Lay Me Down Tonight"
- Released: August 1995
- Length: 3:50
- Label: Warner Bros.
- Songwriter(s): Håvard Rem, Morten Harket
- Producer(s): Christopher Neil

Morten Harket singles chronology
"A Kind of Christmas Card" (1995)	"Spanish Steps" (1996)

"A Kind of Christmas Card" is the debut solo single by Norwegian singer Morten Harket from a-ha, released in August 1995 by Warner Bros. as the first single from his second album, Wild Seed (1995). The song was written by Håvard Rem and Harket, and produced by Christopher Neil. "A Kind of Christmas Card" reached No. 1 in Norway, No. 9 in Iceland, and No. 53 in the United Kingdom. Harket received the Spellemannprisen "Song of the Year" award for "A Kind of Christmas Card".

A music video was filmed in Los Angeles to promote the single. It was directed by Mark Neal and features Harket's then-wife, Camilla Malmquist Harket. In Germany, the song was re-titled to "Burning Out Again (A Kind of Christmas Card)".

== Background ==
The lyrics of "A Kind of Christmas Card" were written by the Norwegian poet Håvard Rem. During a visit to Los Angeles with Harket, they met a friend of Harket's, who told them the true story of a Norwegian girl who had moved to Los Angeles to become a film star, but became involved in pornography and drugs. Speaking to Robert Sandall of VH1, Harket said, "She told Håvard quite a typical story about a young Norwegian girl who came to Los Angeles to become a film star – that was her dream. And very quickly [she] started doing X-rated movies, porno films, and got deeply involved in drugs. When my friend realised what was happening to her, she contacted the Norwegian consulate and got her put on a plane back to Norway – hopefully in time. This prompted Håvard to write the lyrics."

== Critical reception ==
Upon its release, British magazine Music Week gave "A Kind of Christmas Card" three out of five, writing, "A stately song with great strings on which Harket sounds about 60, so throaty and world-weary is his vocal. Not at all what you'd expect from the A-ha man, it bodes well for his first solo album despite the ill-timed winter angle." Mark Sutherland from NME opined that Harket "hasn't got the hang of this 'seasonal record' lark at all. I mean, I've heard of 'Post early for Christmas', but this is ridiculous..."

== Track listings ==
- CD single
1. "A Kind of Christmas Card" – 3:50
2. "A Change Is Gonna Come" – 5:57
3. "Lay Me Down Tonight" – 2:18
- Cassette single (UK release)
1. "A Kind of Christmas Card" – 3:50
2. "Lay Me Down Tonight" – 2:18

== Personnel ==
- Morten Harket – vocals
- Christopher Neil – producer
- Bjørn Nessjø – engineer
- Simon Hurrell – mixing
- Barry Hammond, Kai Robøle – engineers on "Lay Me Down Tonight"

== Charts ==
Chart (1995)	Peak position
Europe (Eurochart Hot 100)	63
Iceland (Íslenski Listinn Topp 40)	9
Norway (VG-lista)	1
Scotland (OCC)	52
UK Singles (OCC)	53
