= Heaven's Not for Saints =

"Heaven's Not for Saints (Let It Go)"

Single by Morten Harket
- Released: 27 May 1996
- Recorded: 1996
- Genre: Alternative rock
- Length: 3:28
- Label: BMG Arista
- Songwriters: Morten Harket, Håvard Rem and Ole Sverre Olsen
- Producer: Steve Lovell

Morten Harket singles chronology
| "Los Angeles" (1996) | "Heaven's Not for Saints (Let It Go)" (1996) | "Tilbake Til Livet" (1996) |

"Heaven's Not for Saints (Let It Go)" is a song by Morten Harket, released as a non-album single in 1996.

The single was released in the UK and Norway only and was Harket's first release on the record label BMG Arista. It reached number 9 on the Norwegian charts.

It was performed as the opening act for Eurovision 1996, which Harket hosted with Ingvild Bryn.

== Critical reception ==
Upon its release in the UK, Daniel Booth of Melody Maker called it "OK, in a melancholy Scandinavian version of sub-U2 navel-gazing kind of way".
