= Letter from Egypt =

Studio album by Morten Harket
- Released: May 19, 2008
- Recorded: 2007–08
- Genres: Alternative rock, synthpop
- Length: 49:02
- Label: Polydor
- Producers: Kjetil Bjerkestrand, Morten Harket

Morten Harket chronology
Vogts Villa (1996)	Letter from Egypt (2008)	Out of My Hands (2012)

Singles from Out of My Hands
- 1. "Movies" Released: November 15, 2007; 2. "Darkspace (You're With Me)" Released: April 4, 2008; 3. "We'll Never Speak Again" Released: June 6, 2008

Letter from Egypt is the fourth studio album by Norwegian singer Morten Harket, released on May 19, 2008. It is his first album since 1996 and second sung in the English language. The album entered the Norwegian Top 40 Album Chart at number one on week 22 (chart published May 26, 2008).

== Singles ==
"Movies" was released as the lead single in Norway on November 15, 2007). The second single, "Darkspace (You're With Me)" was released in Norway on April 4, 2008, and in Germany on May 16, 2008. The German edition includes the bonus track "All Of You Concerned", an English version of the song "Jeg kjenner ingen fremtid" from Morten Harket's third studio album and second Norwegian album Vogts Villa (1996). "We'll Never Speak Again" was released as the third single on June 6, 2008 in Norway.

== Notable performances ==
On 11 December 2007 Morten Harket performed at the Nobel Peace Prize Concert in Oslo, Norway. He played two songs: the title track "Letter from Egypt", and "Movies".

On 20 May, 21 May and 22 May 2008, Morten Harket, along with the other two a-ha members Paul Waaktaar-Savoy and Magne Furuholmen, played three concerts at Rockefeller Music Hall in Oslo to promote their solo material. They also played the same show at Royal Albert Hall in London, England on Saturday 24 May.

== Track listing ==
- All tracks produced by Kjetil Bjerkestrand and co-produced by Morten Harket. Additional production on "Darkspace" and "With You - With Me" by Addi 800 and Petur Jonsson.

No.	Title	Lyrics	Music	Length
1.	"Darkspace"	Ole Sverre Olsen	Morten Harket	3:45
2.	"Send Me an Angel"	Olsen, Tanya	Kjetil Bjerkestrand, Harket, Tanya	3:46
3.	"We'll Never Speak Again"	Magne Furuholmen	Furuholmen, Bjerkestrand	4:20
4.	"There Are Many Ways to Die"	Olsen, Harket	Harket	4:10
5.	"With You - With Me"	Harket, Olsen	Harket	3:48
6.	"Letter from Egypt"	Olsen	Harket	5:25
7.	"A Name Is a Name"	Harket, Olsen	Harket	3:01
8.	"Movies"	Kåre Vestrheim, Georg Buljo, Hans Jørgen Støp, Thomas Tofte, Anders Engen	Vestrheim, Buljo, Støp, Tofte, Engen	3:54
9.	"Shooting Star"	Olsen	Harket	3:55
10.	"Anyone"	Harket	Harket	4:41
11.	"Should the Rain Fall"	Olsen	Harket	4:35
12.	"The One You Are"	Olsen	Harket	3:41

- "Shooting Star" is replaced with "Slanted Floor" on international editions.

== Charts ==
Chart (2008)	Position
German Albums (Offizielle Top 100)	33
Norwegian Albums (VG-lista)	1
