= Vogts Villa =

Studio album by Morten Harket
- Released: 1996
- Recorded: 1996
- Genre: Alternative rock Folk rock Scandinavian Coldwave
- Length: 41:44
- Label: Warner Music Norway
- Producer: Kaare Chr. Vestrheim; Morten Harket

Morten Harket chronology
| Wild Seed (1995) | Vogts Villa (1996) | Letter from Egypt (2008) |

Vogts Villa (Vogt's Villa in English) is a 1996 album by Norwegian singer Morten Harket, sung in Norwegian.

The song "Vuggevise" is a Norwegian-language re-recording of the song "Lay Me Down Tonight" which appeared on Harket's previous album, Wild Seed. "Jeg Kjenner Ingen Fremtid" has been given new English text and, as "All Of You Concerned", appears as a bonus track on the German edition of the single "Darkspace (You're With Me)"; the second single from Harket's 2008 album Letter from Egypt.

== Track listing ==
1. "Tilbake Til Livet" (Returning to Life)
2. "Jeg Kjenner Ingen Fremtid" (Don't Know a Future)
3. "Herre I Drømmen" (Master of Dreams)
4. "Fremmed Her" (Stranger Here)
5. "Søndag Morgen" (Sunday Morning)
6. "Gammal Og Vis" (Old and Wise)
7. "Taksameteret Går" (The Taxi-Meter Goes)
8. "Himmelske Danser" (Celestial Dances)
9. "Lyser Når Du Drar" (Shines When You Leave)
10. "Vuggevise" (Lullaby)

== Charts ==
| Chart (1996) | Peak position |
|---|---|
| Norwegian Albums (VG-lista) | 21 |
