= Stage Dolls =

Norwegian hard rock band

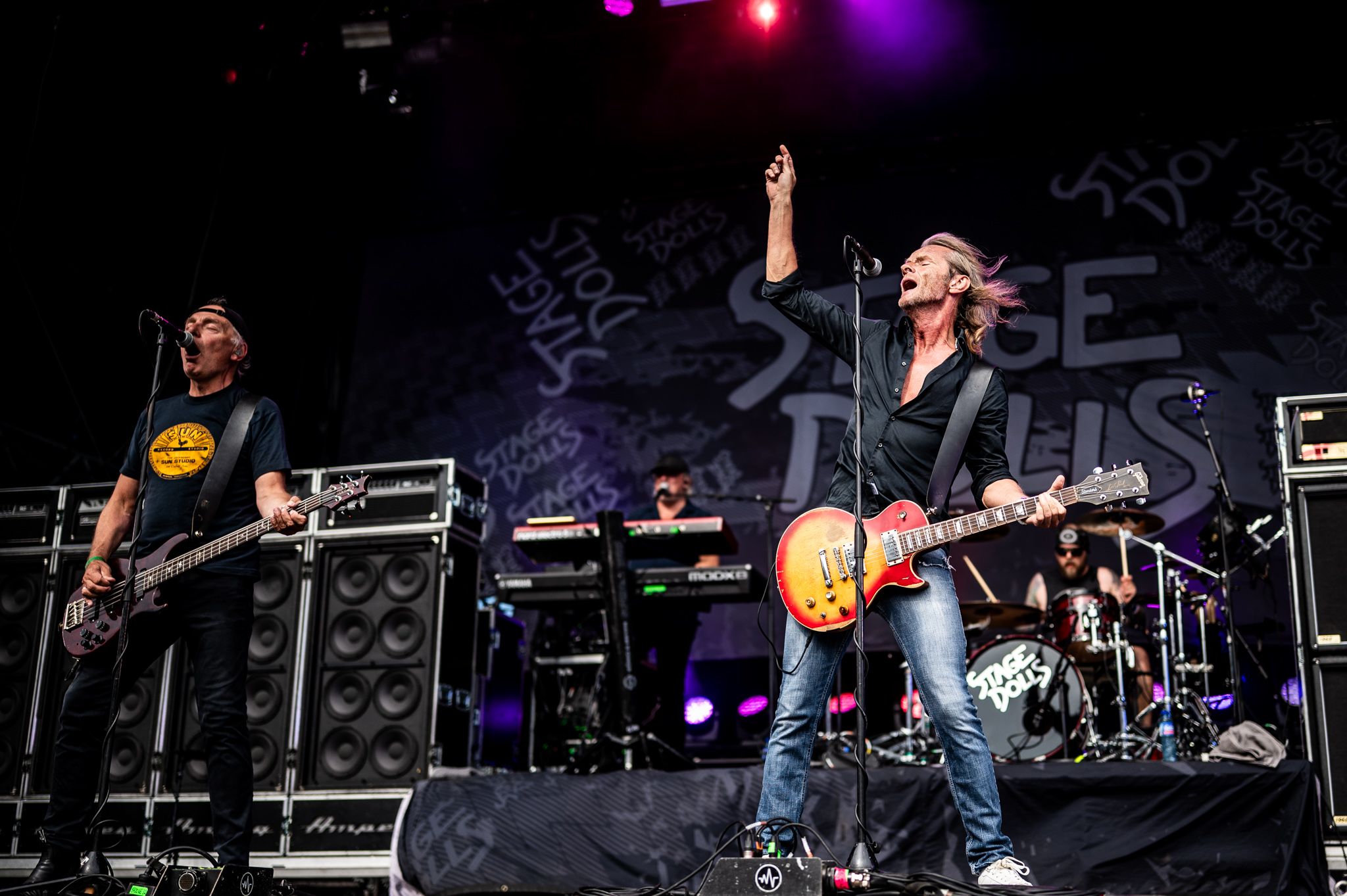
- Stage Dolls at Midgardsblot in 2025

Background information
- Origin: Trondheim, Norway
- Genres: Hard rock, heavy metal, glam metal, AOR
- Years active: 1983–present
- Members: Torstein Flakne; Terje Storli; Thomas Farstad
- Past members: Erlend Antonsen; Steinar Krokstad; Morten Skogstad
- Website: Official website

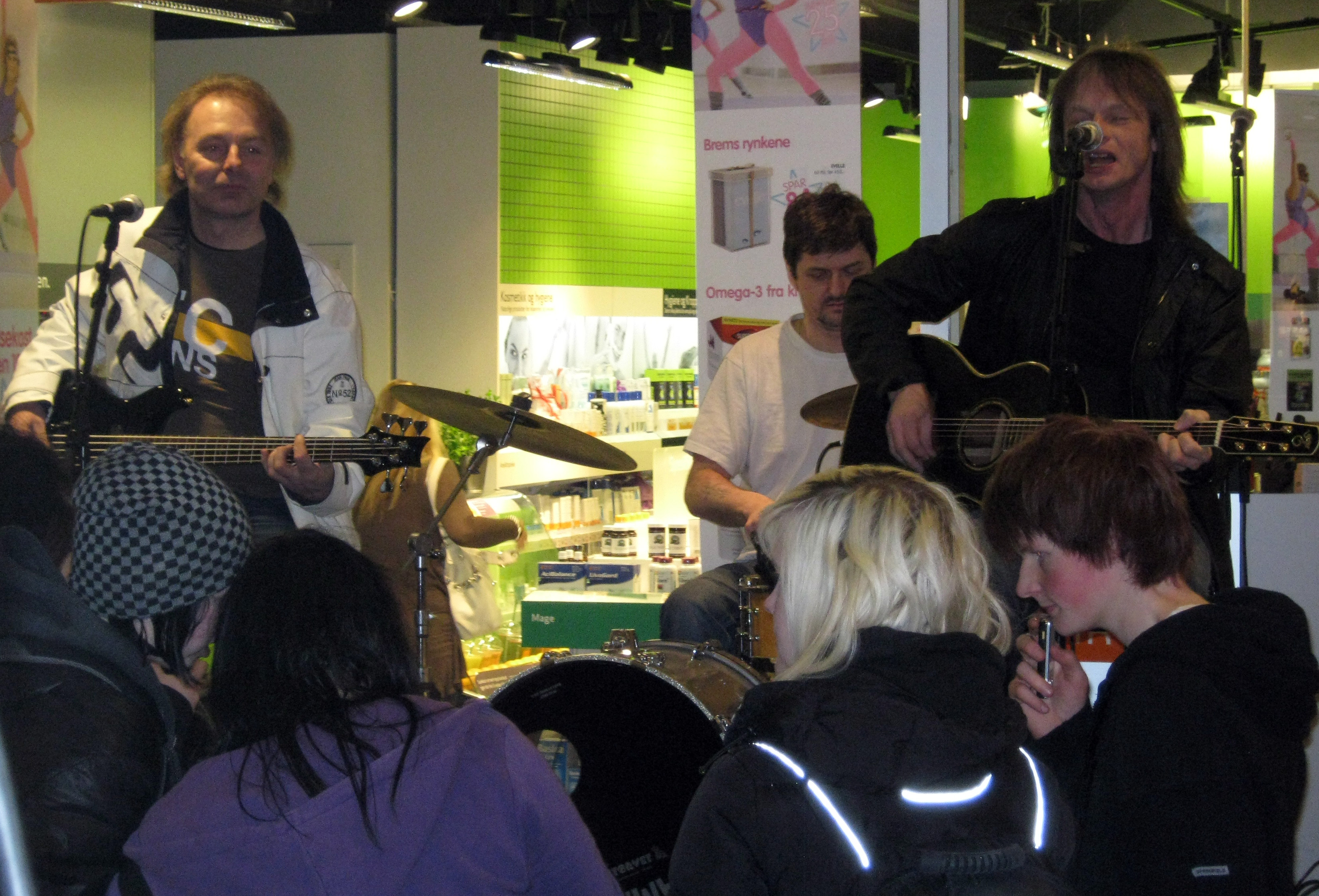
Stage Dolls in Arendal in 2010

Stage Dolls is a Norwegian hard rock band based in Trondheim, Norway.

== History ==
In 1982, Erlend Antonsen and Terje Storli played at local clubs in and around Trondheim. In need of a guitarist they called on Torstein Flakne, who by then had finished playing in The Kids (a popular teeny-band in Norway 1980-82). Throughout the summer and fall of 1982 the newly formed band started rehearsing and playing shows in the region. The trio took the name Stage Dolls in January 1983. The first album, titled Soldier's Gun, was released in late 1985, after a successful nationwide tour in Norway supporting the Norwegian band TNT.

Antonsen left the band in 1985 and was replaced by Steinar Krokstad; he in turn left in 1993 and was replaced by Morten Skogstad.

The recordings for their next album Commandos started in late 1985. It peaked at number 8 in the Norwegian charts (VG) and set the band up as one of the most popular rock bands in Norway in 1986. The album was released in the US by Big Time Records and the title track "Commandos" gained considerable airplay on college-radio.

The self-titled third album was released in 1988. It made it to number 3 at the charts in Norway, and the single "Wings of Steel" went to number 10. In 1989, the band released the album on Chrysalis Records for the American market. The single "Love Cries" went to number 46 on the Billboard Hot 100 the 16th of September, 1989, while the album went to number 118 on the Billboard 200 the 23rd of September, 1989. A second single for the song "Still in Love" was also released in America.

In 1991, the band released a fourth album called Stripped. The album went to number 5 in Norway, and the single "Love Don't Bother Me" charted at number 3. The music video for the song, featured English model Kate Moss.

In 1995, Torstein Flakne released a solo album on Mercury Records in 1995 called Shoot the Moon.

== Personnel ==
=== Current members ===
- Torstein Flakne - lead vocals, lead guitar (1983–present)
- Terje Storli - bass, backing vocals (1983–present)
- Thomas Farstad - drums, percussion (2024–present)

=== Former members ===
- Erlend Antonsen - drums, percussion, backing vocals (1983–1985, 2003)
- Steinar Krokstad - drums, percussion, backing vocals (1985–1993, 2003)
- Morten Skogstad - drums, percussion, backing vocals (1993-2024)

== Discography ==
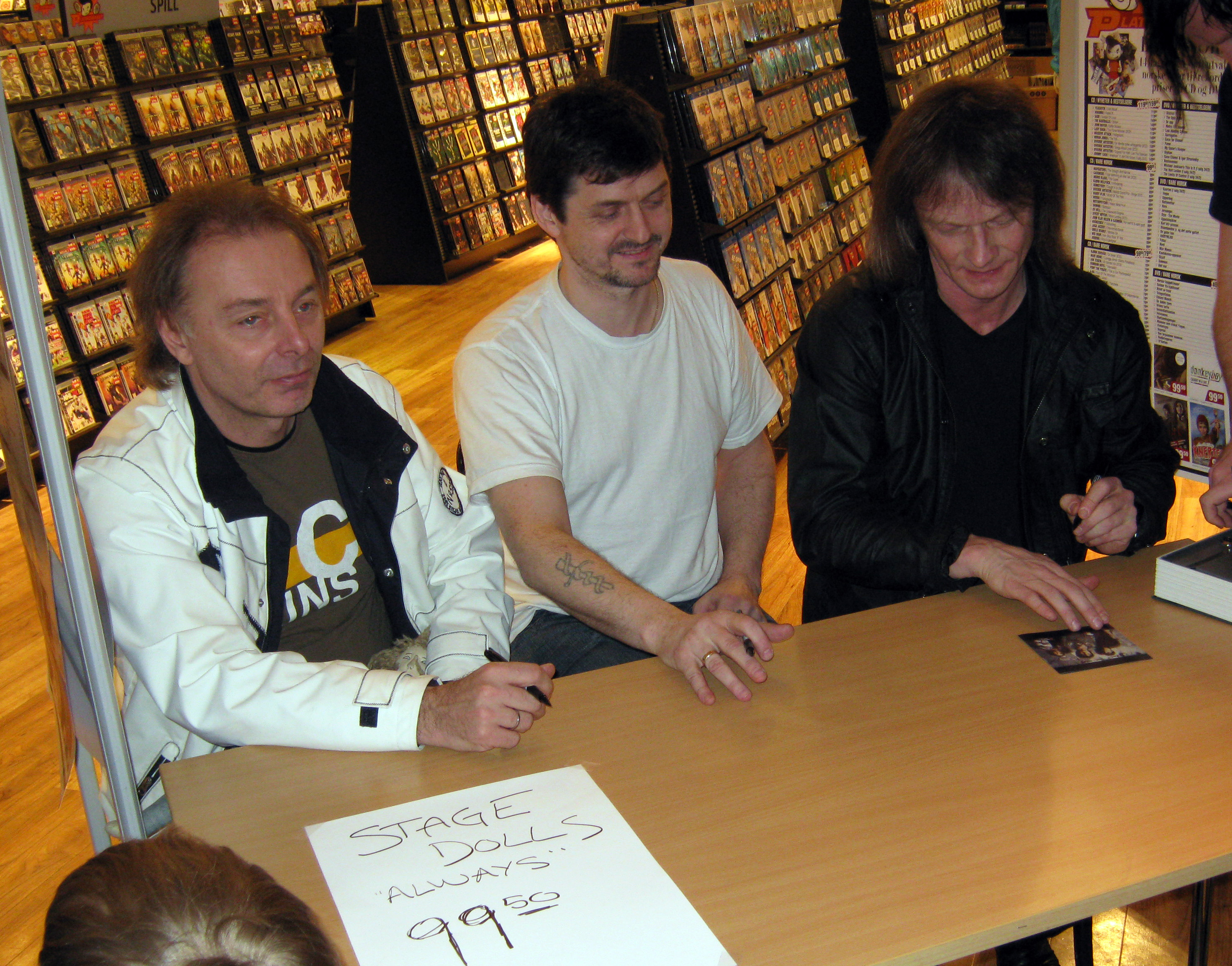
Band signing Always album in 2010

=== Studio albums ===
- Soldier's Gun (1985)
- Commandos (1986)
- Stage Dolls (1988)
- Stripped (1991)
- Dig (1997)
- Get a Life (2004)
- Always (2010)

=== Live albums ===
- Get a Live CD + DVD (2005)

=== Compilation albums ===
- Stories We Could Tell (1993)
- Good Times - The Essential Stage Dolls (2002)
