= Morten Harket =

Norwegian singer (born 1959)

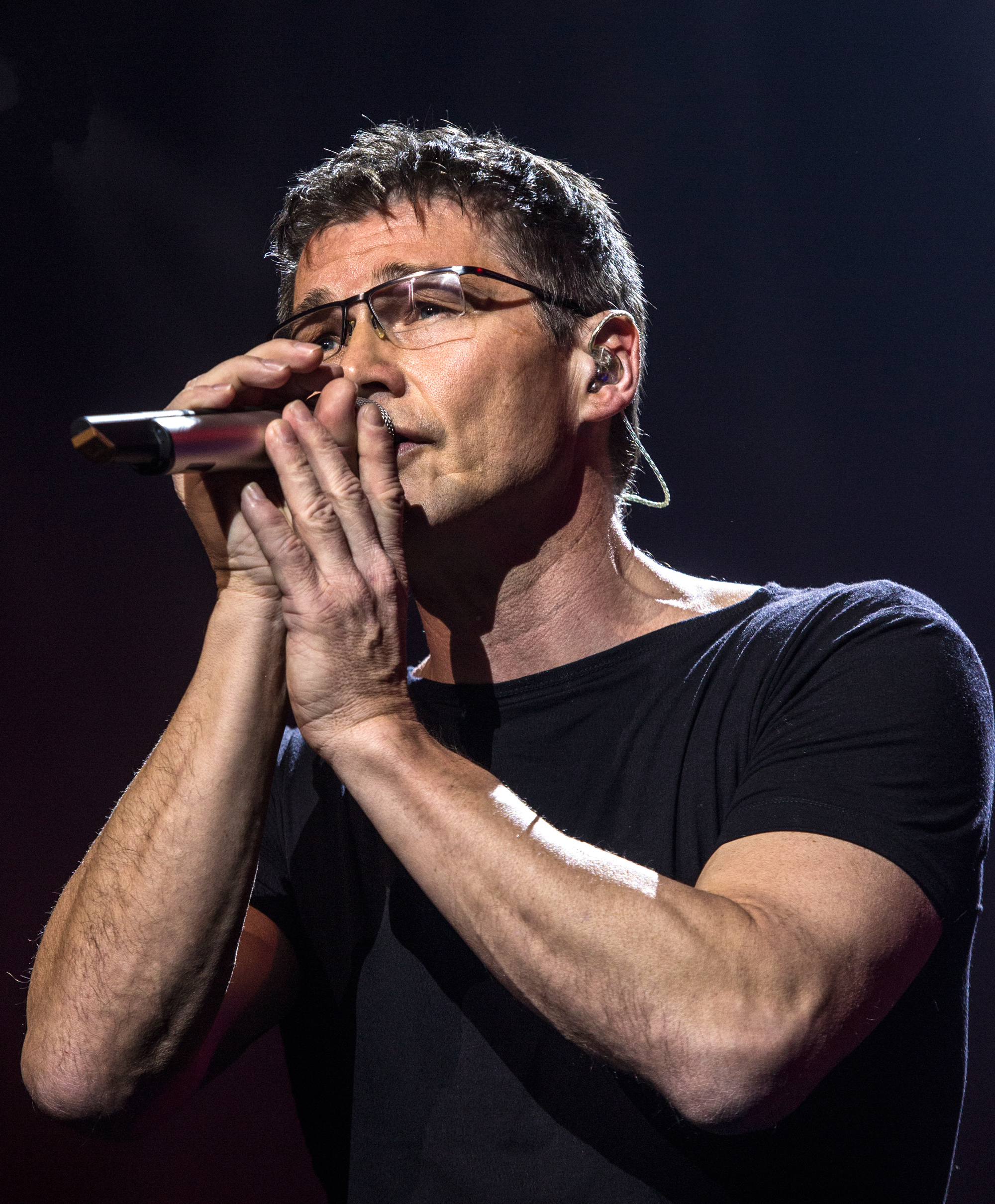
- Harket performing in 2013

Background information
- Born: 14 September 1959 (age 67); Kongsberg, Norway
- Genres: Synth-pop; new wave; pop rock; alternative rock
- Occupations: Singer; songwriter
- Instruments: Vocals; guitar
- Years active: 1982–present
- Labels: Polydor; Warner Bros.; KKV/BMG Norway
- Member of: A-ha

Morten Harket (Norwegian pronunciation: [mʊ̂ʈːn̩ ˈhɑ̀rkət]; born 14 September 1959) is a Norwegian singer who is the lead vocalist of the synth-pop band A-ha.

A-ha has released 11 studio albums as of 2024, and topped the charts internationally with their hit "Take On Me" in 1985. Harket has also released six solo albums. Before joining A-ha in 1982, Harket appeared on the Oslo club scene as the singer for blues outfit Souldier Blue.

Harket was named a Knight First Class of the Order of St. Olav by King Harald for his services to Norwegian music and his international success.

== Early life ==
The son of Reidar, a chief physician at a hospital, and Henny, an economics teacher, and brother to Gunvald, Håkon, Ingunn and Kjetil, Harket grew up in Asker in southern Norway. His early musical influences included Uriah Heep, Jimi Hendrix, Queen, Johnny Cash, Simon and Garfunkel, David Bowie, and James Brown. Harket's father had contemplated becoming a classical pianist; Harket also took piano lessons for a while but lacked the discipline to practice. At the age of four, he started writing music and playing piano.

== Career ==
=== A-ha ===
The trio, comprising lead vocalist Harket, guitarist Paul Waaktaar-Savoy (Pål Waaktaar until his marriage in 1994), and keyboardist Magne Furuholmen, formed on 14 September 1982, and left Norway for London to make a career in the music business. They chose the studio of musician, producer, and soon-to-be-manager John Ratcliff, because it had a Space Invaders machine. Ratcliff introduced the band to his manager, Terry Slater, and, after a few meetings, A-ha had two managers. Slater and Ratcliff together formed T.J. Management. Ratcliff dealt with all the technical and musical aspects; Slater was the international business manager and liaison to Warner Brothers' head office. The band says the name "A-ha" comes from a title Paul contemplated giving to a song; he was dithering between the titles "A-ha" and "A-hem". Morten was looking through Paul's notebook, and came across the name, which he liked, and immediately decided that it was the right name.

In 1984, A-ha released their first single, "Take On Me", which became a hit only on the third attempt in 1985, after it had been re-recorded and accompanied by a music video directed by Steve Barron. The single's international success helped A-ha's debut album Hunting High and Low to sell over 10 million copies worldwide. Their second studio album was Scoundrel Days, followed by Stay on These Roads and East of the Sun, West of the Moon. The band then issued the commercially disappointing Memorial Beach, after which the band went on hiatus.

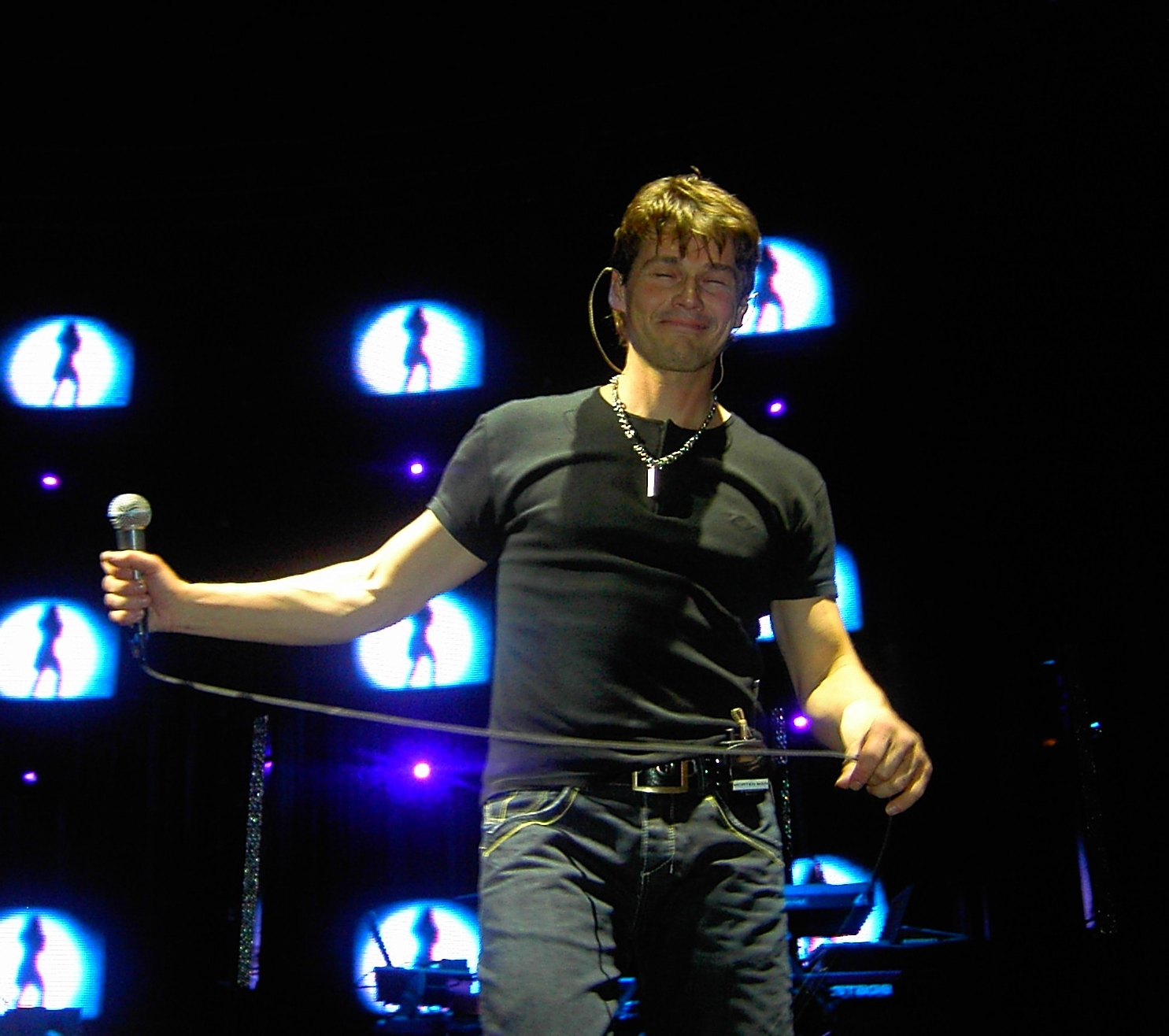
Harket performing at an A-ha concert, 2005

Harket re-joined his colleagues in A-ha in 1998 to perform at the Nobel Peace Prize concert. Since 1998, A-ha has released four studio albums and several compilations. Their eighth studio album Analogue was released in 2005, and became a big hit worldwide, achieving Platinum certification in the UK. The band's last studio album before their split, Foot of the Mountain, was released in the spring of 2009.

Harket held a note for 20.2 seconds in a-ha's 2000 song "Summer Moved On", believed to be the longest note in UK chart history. The note held exceeds the chest voice note in Bill Withers' song "Lovely Day" by 2.2 seconds. In October 2009, A-ha announced that they would disband after a farewell tour in 2010. Tickets for A-ha's final concert at the Oslo Spektrum on 4 December 2010 sold out within two hours. On 27 September 2015, A-ha reunited for a huge crowd assembled at Rock in Rio 2015 festival in Rio de Janeiro, Brazil, which led to a reunion tour and the Cast in Steel album.

In June 2017, the band performed for MTV Unplugged in their homeland. Subtitled as Summer Solstice, this live album was released that October, and the acoustic version of "Take On Me" was made part of the soundtrack of the Hollywood movie Deadpool 2.

==== Band members ====
Paul Waaktaar-Savoy describes Harket as being "totally different from me." He recalls the band's first visit to London together, during which Harket burned all his clothes and re-fashioned his wardrobe. "He has given me self-confidence, encourages me to talk to people, not to be afraid and to use the abilities I have. Morten is actually the only one in Norway who had as much ambition as I did. I guess we both have big egos. In a way, we're each sitting in our own little world, while Mags is more down to earth. Mags often has to mediate between Morten and me... It's good that we're so different and still respect each other. The tension between us is creative."

Magne Furuholmen describes Harket as "together". Furuholmen says Harket "believes strongly in everything he does. This goes for the band too, and it rubs off on us. He has the courage of his own convictions and cannot be shaken. He's an expert at always getting the last word, whether he's right or not. Morten is very loyal and he's fair when it comes to giving people a chance, letting them show who they are and what they're worth before judging them."

On A-ha recordings, Morten has sung with Graham Nash, Lissie, Alison Moyet, Ian McCulloch, Ingrid Helene Håvik and Anneli Drecker.

==== Order of St. Olav ====
The three members of A-ha, Morten Harket, Magne Furuholmen and Paul Waaktaar-Savoy, were appointed Knights of the First Class of the Royal Norwegian Order of St. Olav for their contribution to Norwegian music. The Royal Norwegian Order of St. Olav is granted as a reward for distinguished services to the country and humankind. The official ceremony took place on 6 November 2012.

=== Outside A-ha ===
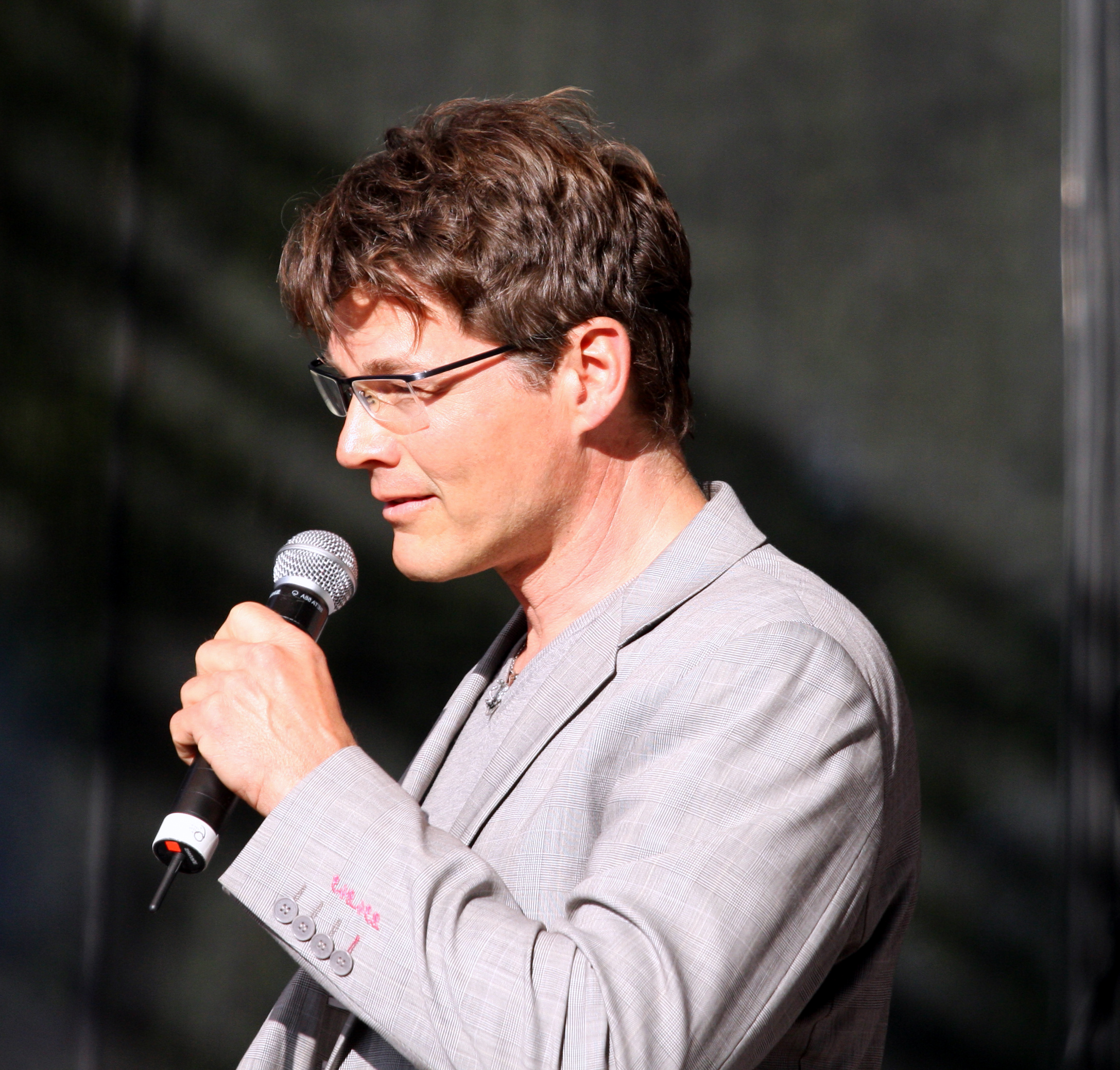
Harket performing in Stavanger, 2010

Before Morten joined Pål and Magne, he was the lead singer of a soul band, Souldier Blue. In 1993, Harket performed a cover of "Can't Take My Eyes Off You" by Crewe/Gaudio on the Coneheads movie soundtrack in 1993.

After A-ha went on a hiatus in 1994, Harket pursued a solo career. He has released six studio albums. Harket released his solo album, Letter from Egypt, on 28 May 2008 via Universal Records Germany. In April 2012, Harket released his new solo album, Out of My Hands, in both Norway and Germany, and on 14 May in the UK. In April 2014, Harket released his sixth album, Brother. He also composed a song with his cousin's son, Blade Whitehead, for an annual music night.

Harket has collaborated in live performances and in studio recordings with several artists, among them Pakistani rock band Junoon, on the songs "Piya" and "Pyar Hai Zindagi"; and Hayley Westenra, on "Children First". He has also performed and worked with many other Scandinavian artists, such as Bjørn Eidsvåg, Silje Nergaard, Oslo Gospel Choir, Espen Lind, Elizabeth Norberg-Schulz and Carola Häggkvist.

In 2009, Harket created and performed the main theme of A Name is a Name, a film about Macedonia by Sigurjon Einarsson.

=== Other appearances ===
In addition to numerous A-ha and solo concerts, Harket has also performed on various other shows and concerts both as a solo artist and with A-ha. Some notable ones:

- Harket was the co-presenter of the 1996 Eurovision Song Contest in Oslo, Norway alongside TV presenter Ingvild Bryn.
- Harket and Klaus Meine of the German band Scorpions performed a duet version of the Scorpions' hit song Wind of Change at a Scorpions concert in Athens, Greece, on 11 September 2013 for an MTV Unplugged album.
- Christina Aguilera and Pitbull performed the song "Feel This Moment", which contains sampling of A-ha's "Take On Me", live at the MGM Grand during the 2013 Billboard Music Awards with a surprise appearance from Morten Harket.
- UNICEF Benefit Concert (2005) – Sang the official UNICEF song "Children First" at the H.C. Andersen jubilee in Copenhagen, Denmark, 2005. The song is a duet and was sung with Hayley Westenra.
- He provided vocals to the Jan Bang single "Merciful Waters" which appears on the group's debut 1989 album Frozen Feelings.
- In January 2021, Harket appeared on the second series of the British version of The Masked Singer, masked as the Viking. He became the first contestant on the franchise to perform their own song, when he sang "Take on Me" in episode five. He finished in seventh place.

== Vocal range and style ==
Harket has a very wide vocal range, which some sources have claimed spans five octaves. In regards to his "rumoured five-octave [vocal] range", Harket himself said in 2009: "I've never counted, quite honestly."

His voice is capable of "the greatest falsetto in the history of pop music EVER...", according to NME's Sylvia Patterson, and of an "unyielding groan" as described in Entertainment Weekly. Sound engineer Gerry Kitchingham, who worked with A-ha on "Take On Me", described Harket as "an excellent singer" with "this incredibly strong falsetto and almost choir-boyish clarity".

== Personal life ==
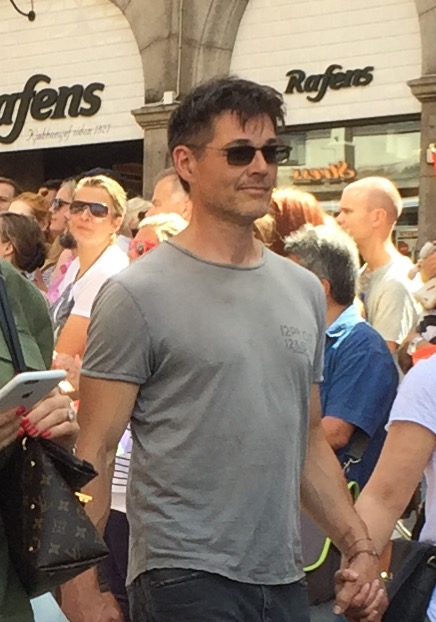
Harket at Oslo Pride parade in 2016

Harket has three children with his former wife Camilla Malmquist Harket whom he was married to from 1989 to 1998. He also has two daughters with former girlfriends Anne Mette Undlien and Inez Andersson.

Harket's hobbies include drawing, painting, music and cars. Along with band member Magne Furuholmen, he is a supporter of Stoke City, an English football team. While maintaining his home in Norway, he also holds residence in London.

In 2025, Harket revealed that he has Parkinson's disease. According to Harket, "I've got no problem accepting the diagnosis. With time I've taken to heart my 94-year-old father's attitude to the way the organism gradually surrenders: 'I use whatever works'." Harket stated that he underwent a deep brain stimulation treatment and asks people to refrain from sending him messages with advice: "I'm going to get so many messages about what to do and how to deal with it. Lots of suggestions for cures and whatnot, all from well-meaning people. I know there are many opinions and alternative theories, but I need to listen to the professionals I have available to me, who are taking care of this with me and for me, and who keep a close eye on developments in many areas of research taking place today. I won't be able to process anything else." Harket's treatment, performed at a Mayo Clinic center in the United States, had the side effect of hindering his voice.

== Discography ==
=== Albums ===
List of albums, with selected chart positions and certifications
Title	Album details	Peak chart positions					
Title	Album details	NOR	AUT	GER	NLD	SWI	UK
Poetenes Evangelium	Released: 9 November 1993; Label: Kirkelig Kulturverksted	—	—	—	—	—	—
Wild Seed	Released: 4 September 1995; Label: Warner Bros.	1	—	—	—	—	89
Vogts Villa	Released: 25 November 1996; Label: Norsk Plateproduksjon	21	—	—	—	—	—
Letter from Egypt	Released: 19 May 2008; Label: Polydor	1	—	33	—	—	
Out of My Hands	Released: 13 April 2012; Label: Universal, Island, We Love Music	1	30	3	77	23	37
Brother	Released: 11 April 2014; Label: Universal	1	—	11	—	62	56
Human Grace	Released: 27 November 2026; Label: Warner Records Germany						

=== Singles ===
List of singles with selected chart positions
Title	Year	Peak chart positions			Album
Title	Year	NOR	GER	UK	Album
"A Kind of Christmas Card"	1995	1	—	53	Wild Seed
"Spanish Steps"	1996	14	—	—	Wild Seed
"Los Angeles"	1996	—	—	—	Wild Seed
"Heaven's Not for Saints (Let It Go)"	1996	9	—	114	Non-album single
"Tilbake Til Livet"	1996	—	—	—	Vogts Villa
"Herre I Drømmen"	1996	—	—	—	Vogts Villa
"Jungle of Beliefs"	1999	—	—	—	Cultures Spans the World (soundtrack)
"A Jester in Our Town"	1999	—	—	—	Songs from Sophie's World – The Musical (soundtrack)
"Kamilla og Sebastian"	2002	—	—	—	Kamilla og Tyven (soundtrack)
"Gildas Prayer" (Earth Affair featuring Morten Harket)	2004	—	—	—	Non-album single
"Kamilla og Tyven" (Remix)	2005	—	—	—	Kamilla og Tyven (soundtrack)
"Movies"	2007	3	—	—	Letter from Egypt
"Darkspace (You're with Me)"	2008	5	73	—	Letter from Egypt
"We'll Never Speak Again"	2008	—	—	—	Letter from Egypt
"Lightning"	2012	—	—	—	Out of My Hands
"Scared of Heights"	2012	1	48	140	Out of My Hands
"I'm the One"	2012	—	—	—	Out of My Hands
"Burn Money Burn"	2012	—	—	—	Out of My Hands
"There Is a Place"	2013	—	—	—	Brother
"Brother"	2014	—	—	—	Brother
"Do You Remember Me?"	2014	—	—	—	Brother
"—" denotes releases that did not chart

== Filmography ==
- 1988 Kamilla og tyven (Kamilla and the Thief) as Christoffer
- 1989 Kamilla og tyven II as Christoffer
- 1996 Eurovision Song Contest as co-host
- 2009 Yohan: The Child Wanderer as Yussuf
- 2010 The Armstrong & Miller Show as himself (cameo appearance)
- 2021 The Masked Singer – as Viking

== See also ==
- List of Eurovision Song Contest presenters

Preceded by (Republic of Ireland) Mary Kennedy	Eurovision Song Contest presenter (with Ingvild Bryn); 1996	Succeeded by (Republic of Ireland) Ronan Keating & Carrie Crowley
