= Kjetil Bjerkestrand =

Norwegian keyboardist (born 1955)

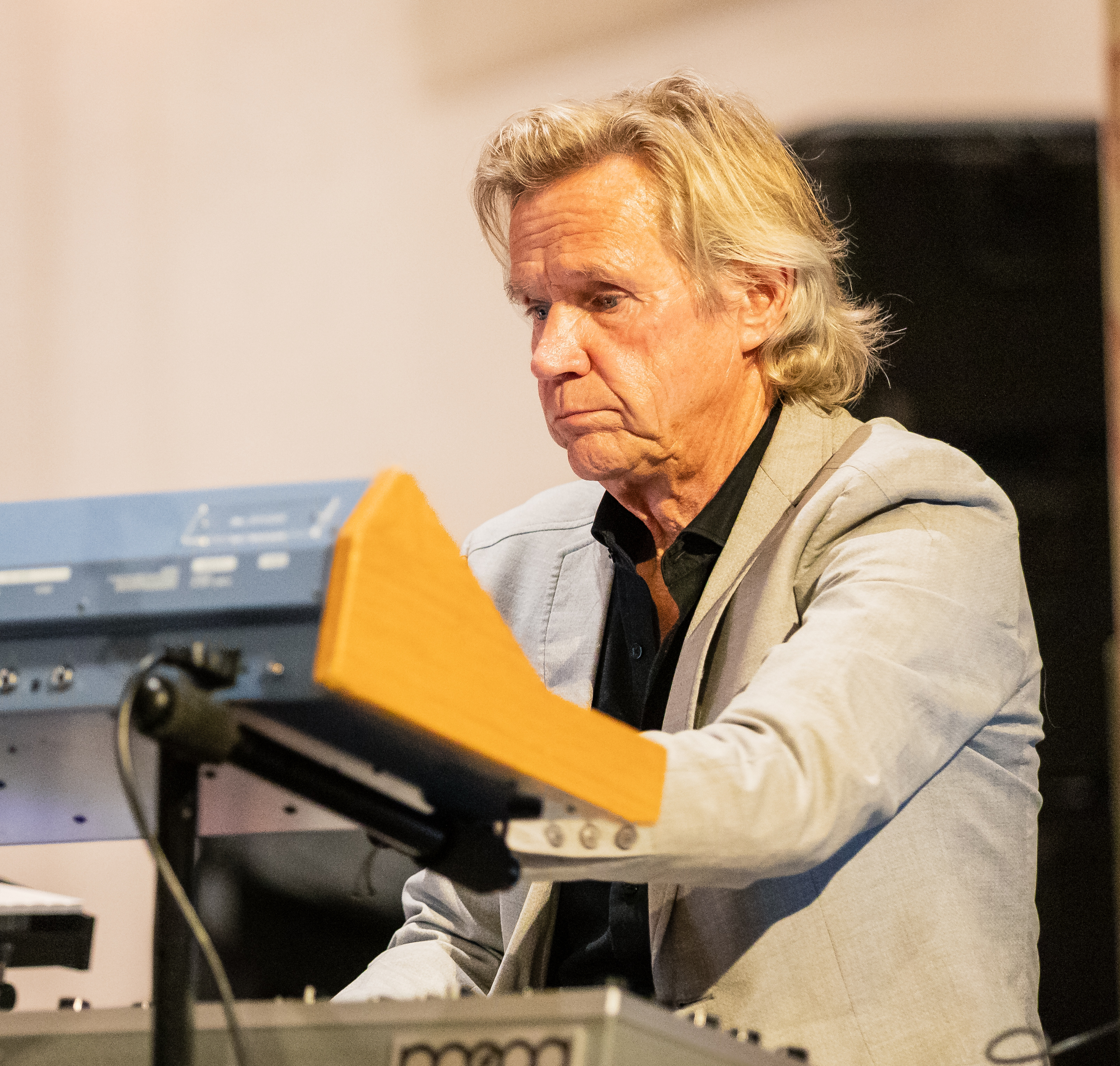
- Kjetil Bjerkestrand performing in Oslo Cathedral, Oslo 2024; Photo: Tore Sætre

Background information
- Born: 18 May 1955 (age 71); Kristiansund, Norway
- Genre: Traditional folk
- Occupations: Musician, composer
- Instruments: Piano, keyboards
- Label: Grappa Music

Kjetil Bjerkestrand (born 18 May 1955) is a Norwegian keyboardist, composer, arranger and record producer known as music arranger for artists like Ray Charles, Dee Dee Bridgewater, Keith Emerson, Ian Hunter, Jon Lord, Ute Lemper and a-ha. As a musician, he has participated in recordings with a-ha, Ray Charles, Ute Lemper, Ian Hunter, Dance with a Stranger, DumDum Boys, Jonas Fjeld Band, Marius Müller, TNT, Arve Tellefsen, Bobbysocks, Bjørn Eidsvåg, Carola Häggkvist and Dee Dee Bridgewater.

== Career ==
As the son and grandson of organists, playing the organ came naturally to Bjerkestrand and he started early to compose music as well. He composed music for several films and television series, many of them in collaboration with Magne Furuholmen under the name Timbersound. He received Gammleng-prisen in 1988 in the class facility, and for the music to the TV series Hotel Oslo he received Edvard Prize 1998 in the class Other form of art, together with Magne Furuholmen. He has produced albums for Anne Grete Preus, a-ha, Lynni Treekrem and Herborg Kråkevik. Along with the saxophonist Tore Brunborg, he has released two albums with Christmas music and hymns. He arranged the music for concerts by Sissel Kyrkjebø in Salt Lake City, in front of The Mormon Tabernacle Choir and Orchestra.

In 2009, Bjerkestrand composed music for the play Sangen om den røde rubin, based on the novel by the same name, together with Anne Grete Preus. In 2010, he released his first solo album Piano Poems on the label Kirkelig Kulturverksted.

== Honors ==
- Gammleng-prisen 1988 in the class facility
- Edvard Prize 1998 in the class Other form of art, together with Magne Furuholmen, for the TV series Hotel Oslo

== Film music ==
- 1987: Veiviseren, with Nils-Aslak Valkeapää & Marius Müller
- 1993: Hodet over vannet
- 1994: Ti kniver i hjertet, with Magne Furuholmen
- 1996: Eremittkrepsen, short Film
- 1997: Hotel Oslo, with Magne Furuholmen – (TV series)
- 1998: Solan, Ludvig og Gurin med reverompa
- 1998: 1732 Høtten, with Magne Furuholmen
- 2001: Øyenstikker, with Magne Furuholmen
- 2002: Karlsson på taket
- 2005: Deadline Torp, (TV series)
- 2005: 37 og et halvt, with Bent Åserud & Geir Bøhren
- 2006: Lange flate ballær
- 2010: PAX, with Dhafer Youssef & Eivind Aarset

== Discography ==
- 1994: Ti kniver i hjertet (film music for Ti kniver i hjertet), with Magne Furuholmen
- 1995: Gull, Røkelse og Myrra (Kirkelig Kulturverksted), with Tore Brunborg
- 1997: Prima Luna (Kirkelig kulturverksted), with Tore Brunborg
- 1997: Hotel Oslo (music for the TV series Hotel Oslo), with Magne Furuholmen
- 1998: Hermetic (Rune Grammofon) (film music for 1732 Høtten), with Magne Furuholmen & Freddie Wadling
- 2001: Dragonfly (film music for Øyenstikker), with Magne Furuholmen
- 2010: Piano poems (Una Corda) (Kirkelig Kulturverksted)
