= Torstein Flakne =

Norwegian singer and guitarist

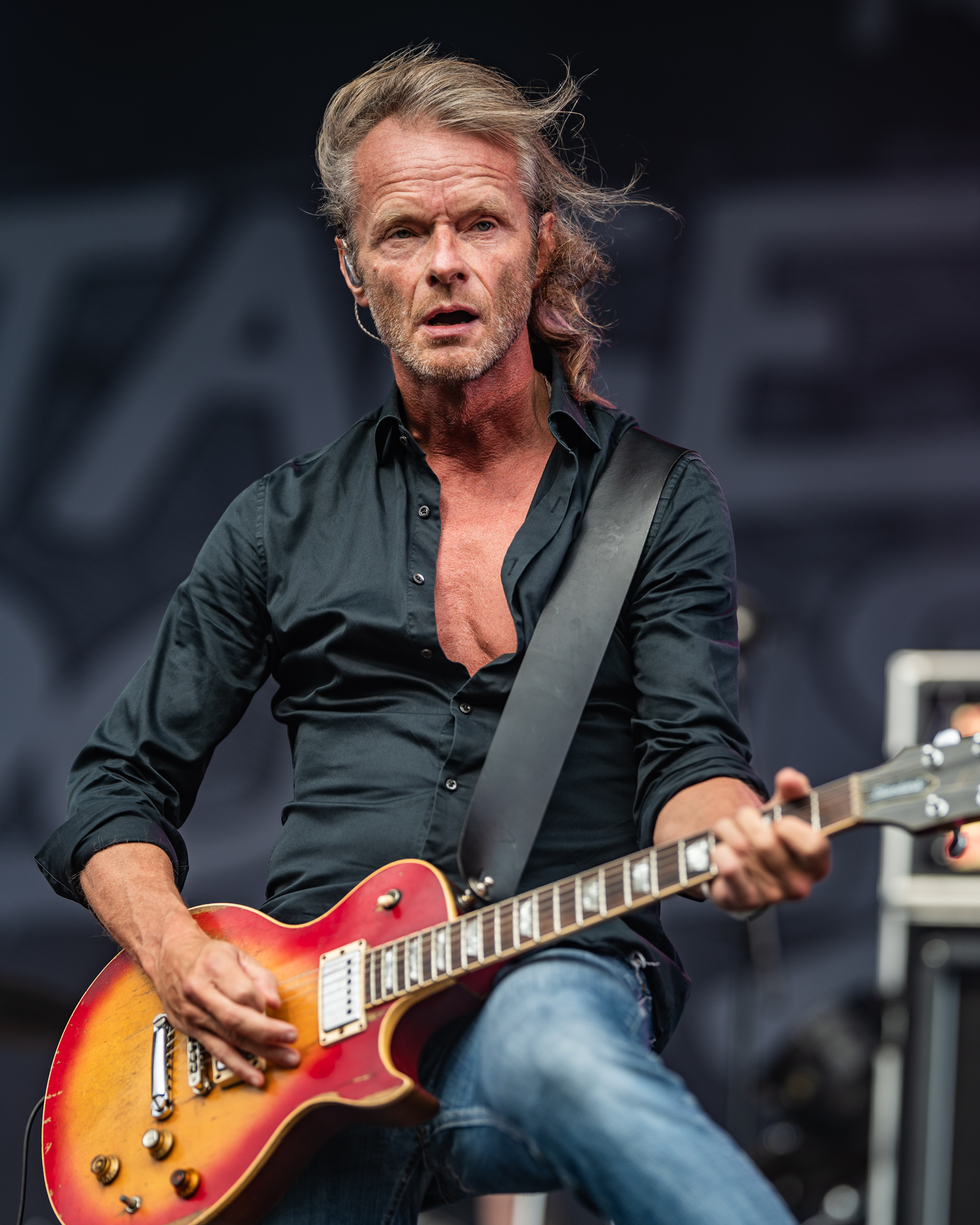
- With Stage Dolls at Midgardsblot, 2025

Background information
- Born: Torstein Flakne; December 17, 1960 (age 65); Trondheim, Norway
- Genres: Hard rock, glam metal
- Occupations: Musician, songwriter, producer
- Instruments: Guitar, vocals
- Years active: 1977–present
- Website: stagedolls.com

Torstein Flakne (born December 17, 1960, in Trondheim, Norway) is a Norwegian singer and guitarist, best known for being the founder of the Norwegian rock band Stage Dolls. He is from Melhus Municipality and played in the band The Kids before founding Stage Dolls in 1985.

== Discography ==
=== Studio albums ===
- Shoot the Moon (1995, Mercury)
1. "All & Everything"
2. "Walkaway"
3. "Heart of a Woman"
4. "The Only One"
5. "Cryin' Over You"
6. "Big Wheels"
7. "It Won't Happen Here"
8. "Divorcee"
9. "Hallelujah Preachers"
10. "The Waiting Kind"
11. "Trouble"
12. "Sweet Dreams"
