= Stronger Than Jesus =

2008 single by A Camp

Single by A Camp

from the album Colonia
- Released: 17 November 2008
- Studio: Stratosphere Sound (New York City); The Magic Shop (New York City); Firehouse 12 (New Haven)
- Genre: Pop
- Length: 3:04
- Label: Wigpowder; Universal; Reveal; Nettwerk
- Songwriters: Niclas Frisk; Nina Persson; Nathan Larson
- Producer: A Camp

A Camp singles chronology
"Song for the Leftovers" (2001)	"Stronger Than Jesus" (2008)	"Love Has Left the Room" (2009)

"Stronger Than Jesus" is a song by Swedish band A Camp from its second studio album, Colonia (2009). It was released as the album's lead single on 17 November 2008 through Wigpowder, Universal, Reveal, and Nettwerk. Following the release of its self-titled debut album in 2001, A Camp went from being the solo project of the Cardigans vocalist Nina Persson to a three-member band. Written and produced by Persson along with the band's remaining members Niclas Frisk and Nathan Larson, "Stronger Than Jesus" stood as the project's first musical output in seven years.

The song was among the first recorded for Colonia. The band selected it as the project's first single as it captured the essence of the album. The pop song features guitar instrumentation, blending elements of Americana, folk, and gospel. Its cynical lyrics metaphorically link colonialism to love and submission while suggesting that love possesses a power greater than that of Jesus. "Stronger Than Jesus" polarized music critics upon its release. While some reviewers praised the song for its quality and appeal, others regarded it as lackluster and simplistic.

The song achieved commercial success as it reached a peak position of number eight on the Sverigetopplistan singles chart, marking it as A Camp's highest-charting entry in Sweden. The Amir Chamdin-directed music video includes kaleidoscope effects and homages to works by David Bowie. A Camp has performed "Stronger Than Jesus" live on numerous occasions, including a televised performance at the 2009 Grammis awards ceremony and a session for Morning Becomes Eclectic in June 2009.

== Background and production ==
Nina Persson, a founding member and lead vocalist of rock band the Cardigans, formed a solo project under the name A Camp with Niclas Frisk in 1998. In September 2001, the project released its minimalist and acoustic debut album A Camp, which spawned the commercially successful single "I Can Buy You" (2001). The album topped the Swedish albums chart and received a gold certification in Sweden. In the years that followed, Persson released two studio albums with the Cardigans, Long Gone Before Daylight (2003) and Super Extra Gravity (2005), before revisiting the A Camp project in 2007. By then Persson's husband Nathan Larson had become part of the project and she transitioned from considering A Camp as her solo project to regarding it as a band. That year, the three started working on a second studio effort under the name A Camp, to be titled Colonia (2009), when their schedules allowed for the project to be completed.

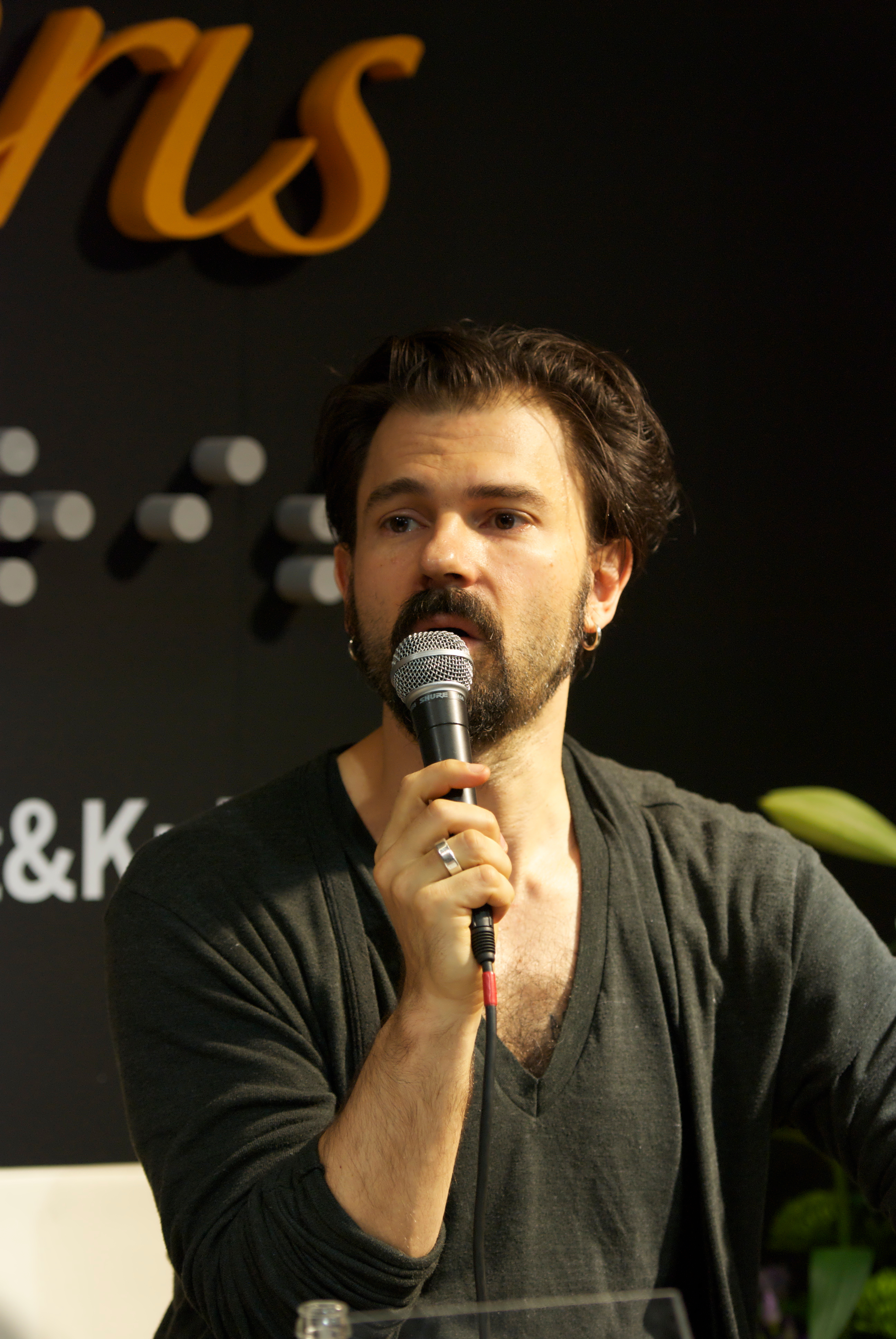
"Stronger Than Jesus" marked A Camp's first release as a band after vocalist Nina Persson's husband Nathan Larson (pictured) became a member.

While the first album drew inspiration from country music, Persson said that Colonia takes on more of a "city" character, describing it as "more urban, more restless", "louder", and "obnoxious" compared to its predecessor. Persson elaborated that the intention was to avoid replicating the first record and instead explore new musical territories. The trio's fascination with history played a significant role in the album's creation. Historical imagery, such as the Belgian Congo, Victorian New York, and the Bowery in the 1970s, influenced the album. Furthermore, the band drew musical inspiration from Adam and the Ants, David Bowie, and Grace Jones, and the new wave genre.

A Camp followed an organized approach for Colonia, setting a three-day deadline to complete three songs. The basis for "Stronger Than Jesus" came about when Frisk recorded himself singing the melody over an acoustic guitar accompaniment. At that stage, the song's structure was nearly complete, described by Frisk as "very simple" but lacking a proper bridge. Once he deemed the chord progression and melody finished, Frisk handed over the song to Persson and Larson to compose lyrics. Persson initially came up with the lyric "I don't wanna live longer than Jesus", but it was ultimately discarded as she found it nonsensical. The band then settled on the hook "Don't you know love is stronger than Jesus?" The initial vocals for the track were recorded at Stratosphere Sound in New York City, with Geoff Sannoff as the recording engineer. The band is credited as producer of the track, and Larson also served as engineer. Frisk, Larson, and Persson all provided backing vocals.

Although it was one of the first songs recorded, all three A Camp members felt "Stronger Than Jesus" was not quite finished at that point. Larson explained their uncertainties about the lyrics and stressed vocals, as well as feeling that the song was too slow. During the mixing process with Al Weatherhead at Firehouse 12 in New Haven, Connecticut, Larson recorded Persson's final vocals for the song using his own laptop and equipment. According to Larson, Persson recorded half of the vocals used in the finished song during mixing. In total, Persson recorded four takes. It was only after the completion of the final vocals and horn sections that the band became confident that the song could be a potential single. The horns were recorded at the Magic Shop in New York City. The final product was mastered by Fred Kevorkian at Kevorkian Mastering, also in New York City. No record label was involved during production of Colonia and all expenses were paid by Persson herself.

== Composition and lyrics ==
"Stronger Than Jesus"
An excerpt from the song, showcasing the sing-along chorus backed by guitar instrumentation. Critics noted the cynical lyrics, describing it as an "anti-love anthem".

"Stronger Than Jesus" is a three-minute and four-second pop song with elements of Americana, folk, and gospel. The song revolves around a melancholic guitar accompaniment; instrumentation also consists of a bass guitar, drums, an electric guitar, a Hammond organ, horns, a melodica, and a piano. It is composed in the key of C♯, which Frisk felt was an important factor. He said, "C♯ is the coldest and most evil of all keys." The track is set at a tempo of 120 beats per minute. As interpreted by Jennifer Heape from The Local, the composition showcases a departure from Persson's typically buoyant and pop-infused vocal style as it is "displaced by a darker, more mature sound". While Persson regarded it a sing-along song similar to the Plastic Ono Band's "Give Peace a Chance" (1969), critics noted different musical influences on the song; Brian Baker described its musical style in the Cleveland Scene as "Sam Phillips arranged by Burt Bacharach", while Kenneth Partridge of the Hartford Courant likened its songwriting to works by Aimee Mann. PopMatters critic Thomas Britt wrote that the song "borrows liberally" from Mann's "How Am I Different" (2000). Per Hägred of Expressen recognized influences from the Beatles, particularly the 1967 songs "All You Need Is Love" and "Strawberry Fields Forever", and identified Persson's nasal vocal style as reminiscent of John Lennon's.

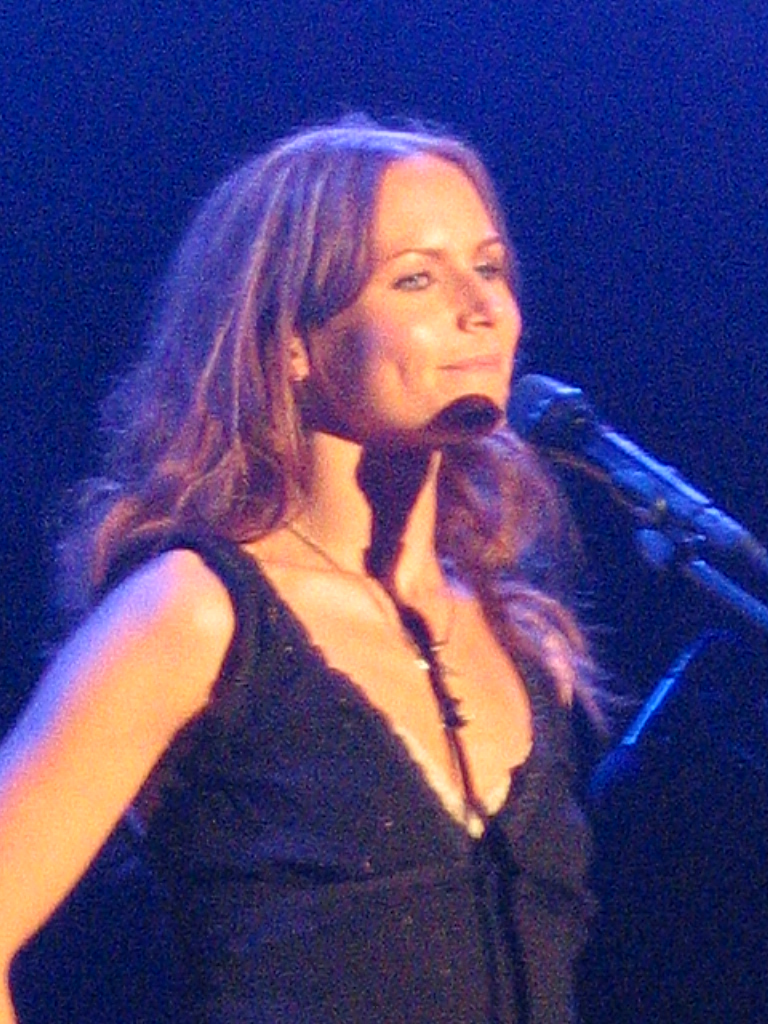
Persson co-wrote the lyrics for "Stronger Than Jesus".

The lyrics of "Stronger Than Jesus" use historical colonialism as a metaphor for love and submission. According to the Los Angeles Times writer August Brown, the song draws parallels to colonialism by delving into power dynamics reminiscent of adventuring nations within the context of love. A direct reference to colonialism is present in the line "We're the Belgians burning in the Congo sun", while the chorus thematically indicates heartbreak. Brown commented, "It's a difficult, Sylvia Plath-worthy position to compare private heartbreak with military subjugation." In the chorus, Persson sings, "Don't you know love is stronger than Jesus? Don't you know love can kill anyone? Bring it on, wars and diseases." Speaking of the song's subject matter, Persson stated, "When it comes to lust, you have the same drive as a colonizer. And on the other end, you let people do all kinds of things to hurt you." Larson added, "Human beings have two drives, the libido and a death wish. Both are present in how America treated Iraq and Afghanistan. It's insane, but the concept is very much with us." Brown likened its theme to the Cardigans' 2003 single "You're the Storm" from Long Gone Before Daylight, and concluded that "pursuit of another is often much more take than give".

I made up the words and it's just catchy. I respect religion but also like to poke fun at it. Religious people are so serious, and for me Jesus and God are inclusive and loving. We have a lot of Catholic fans and they are really upset but I don't see why.

— Nina Persson, Windy City Times

The song suggests love possesses a power greater than that of Jesus. Persson compared its theme to the Cardigans' "Lovefool" from First Band on the Moon (1996), telling the Windy City Times, "[L]ove makes people do fucking crazy things. It has big power over people and more than Jesus. That's what [the song is] about to me." She expressed her respect for religion while also admitting to enjoying lightheartedly teasing or joking about it. Commentators observed cynicism throughout "Stronger Than Jesus"; The Line of Best Fit's Andy Johnson asserted that the lyrics deconstruct the concept of love through a "filter of a disaffection and disappointment", and Sal Cinquemani of Slant Magazine characterized it as an "anti-love anthem". Shannon Zimmerman, reviewing for Spin, wrote that it portrays "love as a murder weapon", referring to the lyric "You know that love can do you like a shotgun".

== Release ==
"Stronger Than Jesus", the lead single of Colonia, was first released on 17 November 2008 in Scandinavia via digital download. The single was distributed through the band's own label Wigpowder, licensed to Universal in Scandinavia. It was the first release under the A Camp moniker since the 2001 single "Song for the Leftovers" from the project's debut album. "Stronger Than Jesus" was selected as Colonia's first single because the band considered it the ideal introduction to the album. Persson also felt that the song bore a musical resemblance to A Camp's first album. The song additionally appears on the 2008 compilation album Absolute Music 59, released by EVA Records as part of the Absolute album series.

In December 2008, "Stronger Than Jesus" was made available outside of Scandinavia through streaming on record label Reveal's website. The label then released the single for purchase on digital retailers across continental Europe and the United Kingdom on 19 January 2009. In Canada and the United States, the single was digitally released under the Wigpowder and Nettwerk labels on 27 January 2009. Although the single was not released for consumption physically, Reveal issued promotional singles in CD and DVD-Video formats in the United Kingdom. In February 2009, an acoustic live recording of "Stronger Than Jesus" was offered for free download to those who signed up for the band's mailing list. The track was recorded in Persson and Larson's home in Harlem, New York City.

== Reception ==
"Stronger Than Jesus" divided music critics. At the time of its release, Olov Hjärtström Baudin from Västerbottens Folkblad selected it as one of the top songs released that week. Some reviewers, including Karin Fredriksson of Helsingborgs Dagblad and Torbjörn Carlsson of Piteå-Tidningen, named it one of the best tracks on Colonia, while AllMusic writer John Bush selected the song as a Track Pick. Similarly, Contactmusic.com's Andy Peterson viewed it as a standout on the album, describing it as a moment of "startling quality", and Göteborgs-Posten critic Jan Andersson chose it as their favourite track on the record and deemed it as strong as "I Can Buy You". Don Leibold, writing for The A.V. Club, also praised the song, calling it a "near-perfect life lesson". In their review of Colonia, BBC Music's Jaime Gill compared the single favourably to album tracks "The Crowning" and "Bear on the Beach," expressing that "Stronger Than Jesus" is equally impressive in quality. Dan Gennoe of Yahoo! Music, who referred to the song as an "obvious single", described it as a "beautifully cynical take on the power of love, complete with twisted metaphors and swelling gospel for the chorus."

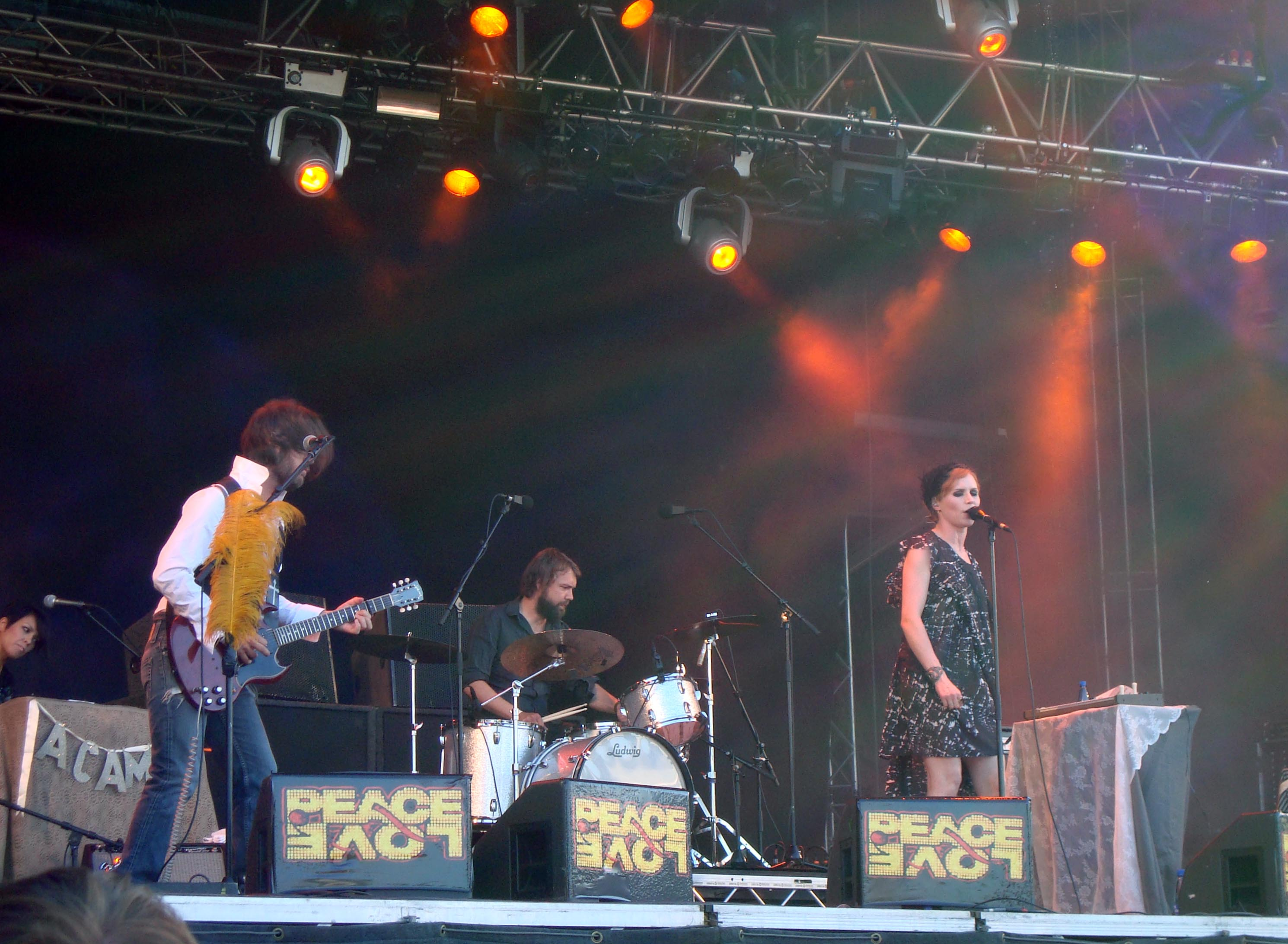
A Camp on stage at the 2009 Peace & Love festival, where "Stronger Than Jesus" was performed

Some reviewers expressed various concerns with the song. In a critical assessment, Britt, writing for PopMatters, opined that many tracks on Colonia are "overly adorned", commenting that "Stronger Than Jesus" includes an "unnecessarily insistent vocal delivery". Britt critiqued the song's placement after the anthemic opening track "The Crowning": "To begin an album with an anthem is a tricky prospect, particularly when its momentum does not carry over into the following track." Alex Young of Consequence wrote that the album's method of "elegant and rich orchestrations" may not necessarily add excitement to the music, which they felt was evident with "Stronger Than Jesus". The writer described the single as "cognac-bitter and rather dull". Johanna Åberg of Upsala Nya Tidning felt that it was somewhat dull as well in comparison to the rest of the album. Iain Moffat of The Quietus remarked that the music of Colonia does not consistently embody the "awkwardness of ambition" of the lyricism. In the case of "Stronger Than Jesus", Moffat concluded that the song is overrun by an overly simplistic and predictable approach.

Arbetarbladet's Erik Süss named "Stronger Than Jesus" the best song of 2008, and Karin Hellström of Borlänge Tidning declared it among eight of the best songs of 2009. Commercially, the song is A Camp's highest-charting entry on the Sverigetopplistan singles chart and second entry overall after "I Can Buy You". "Stronger Than Jesus" initially made its debut at number 22 on 27 November 2008 and fell off two weeks later. It re-entered the chart on 9 January 2009 and peaked at number eight on 6 February. In total, "Stronger Than Jesus" spent eleven non-consecutive weeks on the chart. Additionally, the song attained a peak position of number six on the Swedish DigiListan chart, based on digital downloads.

== Music video ==
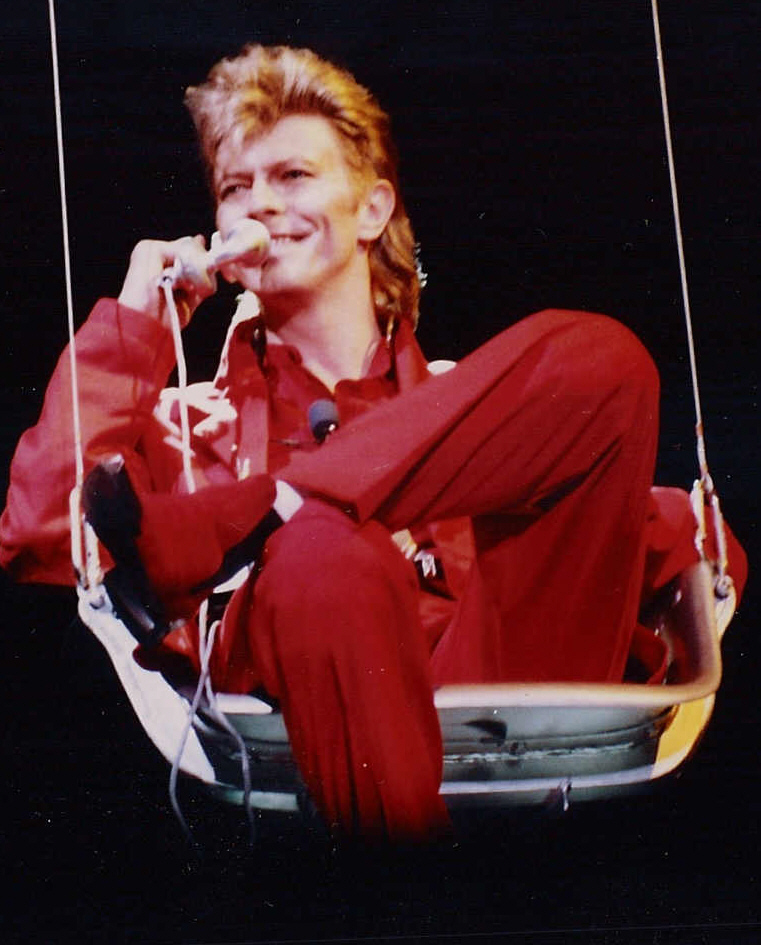
The video for "Stronger Than Jesus" was visually inspired by works of David Bowie.

Amir Chamdin directed the music video for "Stronger Than Jesus". Chamdin previously collaborated with Persson and Larson on his feature film God Willing (2006), for which Chamdin and Persson starred in the leading roles and Larson composed the music. Chamdin also served as director of the videos for the Cardigans' 2003 singles "For What It's Worth" and "You're the Storm". The video for "Stronger Than Jesus" was released on 3 December 2008 via Universal Sweden's YouTube channel. Visually inspired by the works of Bowie, the video's "classic 70s look" was the result of an "extremely low budget". Persson described the video as an attempt to pay homage to the music video for Bowie's 1980 single "Ashes to Ashes". She said, "It's a bit embarrassing, because it didn't turn out so well."

In the video for "Stronger Than Jesus", A Camp performs the song in a dark room. Persson, wearing a white dress and gloves, is multiplied over the screen in kaleidoscope effects. A staff writer from Pitchfork observed that the video includes "glitzy 1970s TV effects", and The Washington Post's Catherine Lewis commented that "Persson moves on a stage like she's giving a recital, surrounded by stage lights and dolled up in a retro-looking costume". Writing for Stereogum, Brandon Stosuy concluded, "[E]ach member gets a moment to multiply kaleidoscopically, but it's [Persson's] appropriately (a) campy hand gestures and belted vocalizations that fill-up the frame. It looks like she's been taking choreography and glove-wearing classes from Becky Stark."

== Live performances ==
A Camp premiered "Stronger Than Jesus" live along with three other Colonia tracks during a concert at a Stockholm bar on 18 November 2008. The band presented a televised performance of the song at the Grammis awards ceremony on 7 January 2009, and performed it in a session for Svenska Dagbladet later the same month. The band then performed the song as part of a set on radio programme Morning Becomes Eclectic on 19 June 2009, followed by a rendition on SVT1's Allsång på Skansen on 30 June. The band also included the song in its live set on the inauguration of Pride Park at Stockholm Pride on 29 July 2009. During its tours in Sweden and the United States in the spring and summer of 2009, A Camp included "Stronger Than Jesus" in the set lists. The tour visited venues and festivals such as the Hultsfred Festival and Peave & Love. The song served as the closing number before the encore. Critics gave positive reviews of the band's live performances of the song; Thomas Björling of Sundsvalls Tidning regarded it as one of the concert's highlights, while Johan Persson of Kristianstadsbladet described it as "paradoxically an almost religious experience", singling it out as a standout moment of the show.

== Track listing ==
- Digital download
1. "Stronger Than Jesus" – 3:04
- Digital download
1. "Stronger Than Jesus" (Harlem Session) – 3:18

== Credits and personnel ==
Credits are adapted from the Colonia liner notes and Tidal.

Studios

- Recorded at Stratosphere Sound (New York City), the Magic Shop (New York City), and Firehouse 12 (New Haven)
- Mixed at Firehouse 12 (New Haven)
- Mastered at Kevorkian Mastering (New York City)

Personnel

- A Camp – production
- Niclas Frisk – songwriting
- Nina Persson – songwriting
- Nathan Larson – songwriting, engineering
- Al Weatherhead – mixing
- Geoff Sanoff – recording
- Fred Kevorkian – mastering

== Charts ==
Chart performance for "Stronger Than Jesus"
Chart (2009)	Peak position
Sweden (Sverigetopplistan)	8

== Release history ==
Release dates and formats for "Stronger Than Jesus"
Region	Date	Format	Label	Ref.
Scandinavia	17 November 2008	Digital download	Wigpowder; Universal	
Europe	19 January 2009	Digital download	Wigpowder; Reveal	
Canada	27 January 2009	Digital download	Wigpowder; Nettwerk	
United States	27 January 2009	Digital download	Wigpowder; Nettwerk	
