= My America (song) =

Single by A Camp

from the album Colonia
- Released: 25 May 2009
- Genre: Pop
- Length: 3:13
- Label: Wigpowder; Universal
- Songwriter(s): Niclas Frisk; Nina Persson; Nathan Larson
- Producer(s): A Camp

A Camp singles chronology
| "Love Has Left the Room" (2009) | "My America" (2009) |

"My America" is a song by Swedish band A Camp from its second studio album, Colonia (2009). It was released as the album's third and final single on 25 May 2009 through Wigpowder and Universal. The single was only released in Scandinavia, while "Love Has Left the Room" (2009) served as a single in Ireland and the United Kingdom that same month.

== Background and composition ==
"My America" was written and produced by A Camp, consisting of Niclas Frisk, Nina Persson, and Nathan Larson. The song was digitally released as a single on 25 May 2009 in Scandinavia through Wigpowder and Universal. It was the second single released in that region from the album, and the third single overall. "Love Has Left the Room" (2009) acted as the album's second single in Ireland and the United Kingdom, released earlier in May 2009.

Musically, "My America" is a fast-paced pop song with influences of soul music. Göteborgs-Posten's Jan Andersson compared it to works by the Pretenders and Lolita Pop, while Johanna Åberg of Upsala Nya Tidning likened the horn instrumentals to the catalogue of Roxy Music. According to Stuart Berman of Pitchfork, Persson portrays a "subservient rock-star groupie" on the song. In the chorus, Persson sings "It's a cold hearted world. I'm gonna be a girl".

== Reception ==
"My America" was met with generally positive reviews from music critics. Lina Hård of Nya Wermlands-Tidningen appreciated the sing-along chorus and declared it an improvement over Colonia's lead single "Stronger Than Jesus" (2008). Writing for the same newspaper, Carl Edlom noted Persson's vibrato throughout the album and singled out her use of the technique on "My America", writing that it gives the song "extra spice". Göteborgs-Posten critic Jan Andersson highlighted the song as one of the better tracks on the album, as did Niclas Holmlund of Västerbottens Folkblad. In a mixed review of Colonia, Mats Bengtsson of Nerikes Allehanda commended "My America" for its horn intro and Persson's vocal performance. Dan Gennoe of Yahoo! Music called the song an "obvious single", labelling it "the naïve little sister" to David Bowie's "Young Americans" (1975). In a critical review, Thomas Britt, writing for PopMatters, described the song as an anthem and opined that it "purports to signify a lot but is ultimately undermined by its own anthemic tendencies". Sal Cinquemani of Slant Magazine considered the song the only "serious flub" on Colonia, "'My America' [is] the by-the-numbers radio-rock of which sticks out like a bald head amid a room full of powdered wigs."

"My America" did not enter the Sverigetopplistan singles chart. It peaked at number 19 on the Trackslistan radio chart.

== Credits and personnel ==
Credits are adapted from the Colonia liner notes and Tidal.

- A Camp – production
- Niclas Frisk – songwriting
- Nina Persson – songwriting
- Nathan Larson – songwriting, engineering, studio personnel
- Al Weatherhead – mixing, studio personnel
- Geoff Sanoff – recording, studio personnel
- Fred Kevorkian – mastering

== Charts ==
Chart performance for "My America"
| Chart (2009) | Peak position |
|---|---|
| Sweden (Trackslistan) | 19 |
