= A Camp =

Swedish musical group

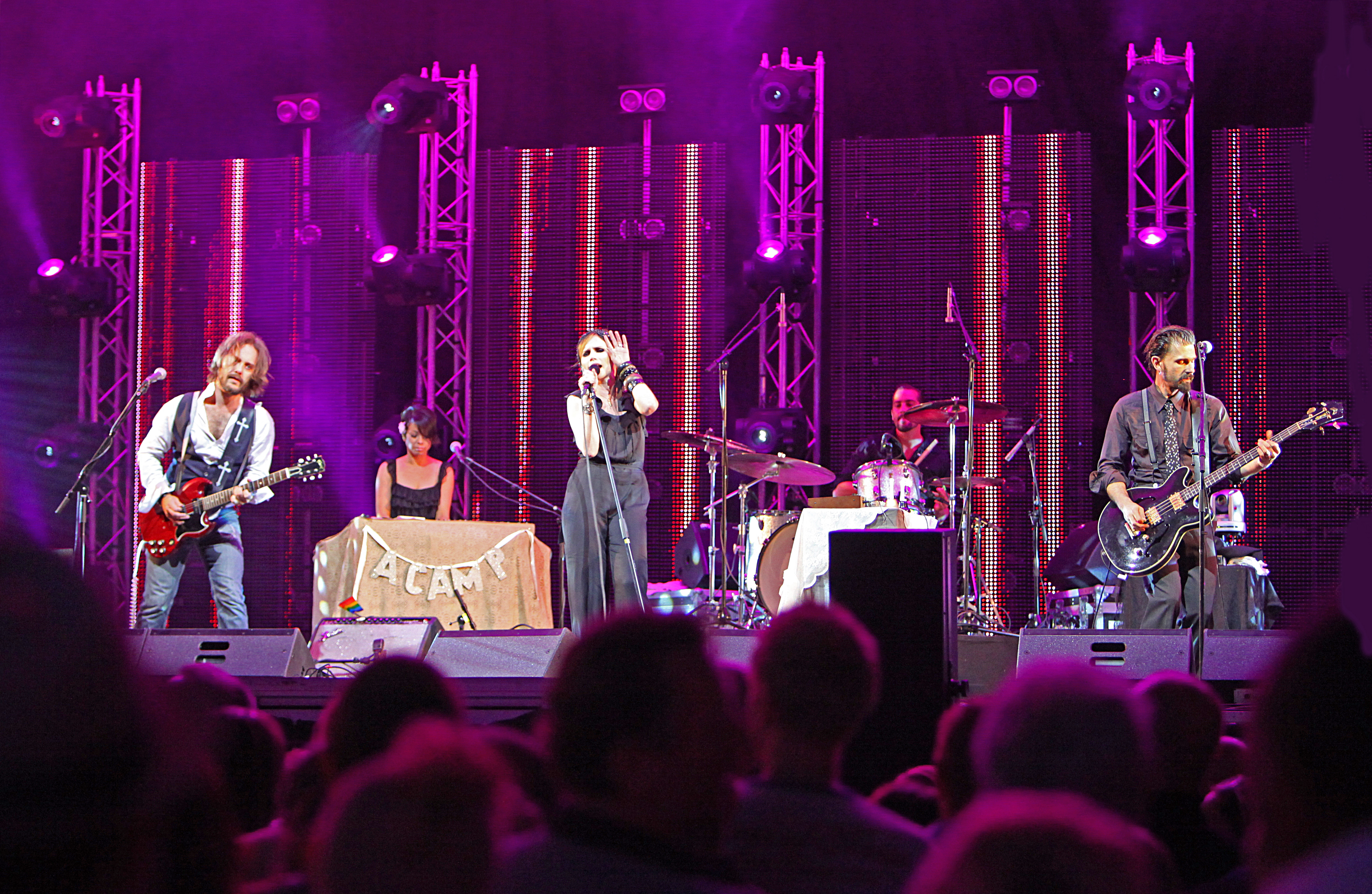
- A Camp at Stockholm Pride Festival, July 2009

Background information
- Origin: Sweden
- Genres: Alternative rock, indie pop
- Years active: 2001–present
- Labels: Universal/Polydor; Stockholm Records
- Members: Nina Persson; Niclas Frisk; Nathan Larson

A Camp is the solo side project of Nina Persson, vocalist for the Swedish indie pop band The Cardigans, her husband, composer Nathan Larson, and former Atomic Swing guitarist Niclas Frisk. Persson formed A Camp when The Cardigans took a break after several years of touring and the recording of their 1998 album Gran Turismo. A Camp recorded and released two albums, in 2001 and 2009, after which the project has been inactive.

== Albums ==
=== A Camp ===
A Camp's debut album, also called A Camp, was originally recorded with Niclas Frisk of Atomic Swing, before Persson teamed up with Mark Linkous of Sparklehorse to re-record it. In doing so, he also contributed some new songs to the album. Persson had been a long-time fan of Sparklehorse and has referred to them as "the best I've ever heard". After a gig in Lund, Sweden, Persson gave Linkous a cassette of all the demo A Camp songs. When they met again during the recording of his new album, Persson invited him to produce her project. Linkous listened, liked the songs, and agreed.

The album met with critical acclaim, and reasonable commercial success, topping the charts in Persson's native Sweden.

In 2004, "Charlie Charlie" (the "I Can Buy You" single B-side) was covered (with new lyrics in Polish) by the Polish singer Ania and released as a single from her debut album Samotność po zmierzchu. A French version of "Charlie Charlie" was recorded by Vanessa and the O's for inclusion on their debut album La Ballade d'O in 2004 which retained the same title. Vanessa & The O's featured Niclas Frisk, Andreas Mattsson, James Iha and French singer songwriter Vanessa Quinones.

The debut album released the singles "I Can Buy You" and "Song for the Leftovers". The country-inspired influence was also apparent in The Cardigans' following album, Long Gone Before Daylight, which was released in the UK in 2003 and the US in 2004.

=== Colonia ===
The recording of a second A Camp album was confirmed by Persson in an interview with Swedish newspaper Dagens Nyheter in May 2007. "Girl-pop from the 60s, 80's punk, and David Bowie" were said to be the main influences. The album, produced by Persson with husband and film composer Nathan Larson and Atomic Swing's Niclas Frisk, features appearances from ex-Smashing Pumpkins guitarist James Iha, Joan As Policewoman and Guided By Voices drummer Kevin March.

The first single from Colonia, "Stronger Than Jesus", was released on the Swedish iTunes on 17 November 2008. The full album was released in Europe in February 2009, via Universal, and in the US via Nettwerk.

=== Covers EP ===
A three-track EP named Covers, featuring interpretations of Pink Floyd's "Us And Them", David Bowie's "Boys Keep Swinging" and Grace Jones' "I've Done it Again", was released digitally in the United States on 9 June 2009 and in Europe on 16 June 2009.

== Post 2009 ==
Persson has continued to record and perform as a solo artist, and reunite with The Cardigans for occasional tours. There are not known to be any plans for further A Camp recordings.

== Discography ==
=== Studio albums ===
List of studio albums, with selected chart positions and certifications
Title	Album details	Peak chart positions									Certifications
Title	Album details	SWE	AUT	DEN	FIN	GER	IRL	NOR	UK	US Heat	Certifications
A Camp	Released: 20 August 2001; Label: Stockholm Records, Universal; Formats: CD, digital download	1	35	40	21	91	64	11	87	—	GLF: Gold
Colonia	Released: 28 January 2009; Label: Universal, Reveal Records; Formats: CD, LP, digital download	2	—	—	—	—	—	—	114	22	GLF: Gold

=== EPs ===
List of EPs, with selected details
Title	Album details
Covers	Released: 9 June 2009; Label: Nettwerk; Formats: CD, digital download

=== Singles ===
List of singles, with selected chart positions, showing year released and album name
Title	Year	Peak chart positions			Album
Title	Year	SWE	NLD	UK	Album
"I Can Buy You"	2001	17	85	46	A Camp
"Song for the Leftovers"	2001	— (Note: "Song for the Leftovers" did not enter the Sverigetopplistan singles chart, but peaked at number 14 on the Trackslistan chart.)	—	—	A Camp
"Stronger Than Jesus"	2008	8	—	—	Colonia
"Love Has Left the Room"	2009	— (Note: "Love Has Left the Room" did not enter the Sverigetopplistan singles chart, but peaked at number 15 on the Trackslistan chart.)	—	—	Colonia
"My America"	2009	— (Note: "My America" did not enter the Sverigetopplistan singles chart, but peaked at number 19 on the Trackslistan chart.)	—	—	Colonia
