= Vanessa and the O's =

Vanessa and the O's is a musical group formed in 2003/2004. It was created in New York City when Parisian Vanessa Contenay-Quinones (known for Allez Pop!) got together with Swedish musical collaborators Andreas Mattsson (Popsicle) and Niclas Frisk (Atomic Swing) and joined up later with James Iha (former guitarist and co-founding member of The Smashing Pumpkins).

== Timeline ==
=== Initial album La Ballade d'O (2003–2007) ===
They recorded the album La Ballade d'O over the next 18 months. Quinones also went into the studio with Lou Reed around this time and cut an Anglo/French version of "Sunday Morning" under the name 'Vanessa St James ft Lou Reed'. The O's album was finally finished in 2005 when Pelle Gunnerfeldt (producer of The Hives) was brought in for additional production and mixes, bringing in Per Nordmark on drums and Bjorn Ytlling (of Peter Bjorn & John) for additional keyboards. The self-financed album was licensed initially to Virgin/EMI Sweden in May 2005 for Scandinavian release only.

In September 2005, the imported debut was Album Of The Week in London record store Rough Trade who described it as "...a fantastic album of ‘European cool’ with breathy vocals over music which sounds like The Concretes, Stereolab or a modern take on the Velvet Underground…" and in 2006 the band released La Ballade on their own Rushmore Recordings label headed up by ex Warner Bros A&R executive and Deaf School founder member Steve Allen. By Summer 2007, it was available physically in France, Japan, Thailand, Portugal, Finland, Norway, Denmark, and Sweden, as well as digitally distributed.

==== Reception ====
"Incontournable!...un album estival, lumineux, en teintes blanches, jaunes et pourpres...c'est un miracle..Vanessa a la classe total!"

— Nicolas Ungemuth, Rock & Folk

La Ballade received great critical acclaim. In France, the influential rock critic Nicolas Ungemuth reviewed it favourably for Le Figaro and the magazine Rock & Folk. The band also received rave reviews from the other leading French music writers at Les Inrockuptibles, Magic, and Rolling Stone. The album received a year-in-review award from Le Figaro.

=== 2007 onwards ===
- In 2006, Vanessa Quinones was the guest vocalist on Scott Walker's album The Drift. The O's also played live at shows in Sweden, France, Japan, Holland and the UK through 2006-2010.
- 2007 saw The O's invited to participate in the all-star musical tribute to legendary composer Ennio Morricone alongside Bruce Springsteen, Metallica, Yo Yo Ma, Quincy Jones, Herbie Hancock and Ennio Morricone. "We All Love Ennio Morricone" features Vanessa & The O's rendition of the Morricone/Françoise Hardy classic "Je Changerais d'Avis".
- In 2008/9 Vanessa started her solo project Vanessa presents Allez Pop!, her first fully French language album in what would become a series of 60's influenced French pop and Yeh Yeh recordings. Original songs from the album included "Pres de Toi", "C'est Magnifique". "Oddysee", "Quand Tu Me Dis", Pourquoi Pas and Bon Bon Bon and appeared on many international French pop and lounge compilations between 2009 and 2012. The title track Bon Bon Bon garnered excellent press reviews from number one French culture and music mag Les Inrocks and Rolling Stone France amongst many others. It was also featured in the soundtrack of several movies including 'Lionsgate Films' action/rom-com Killers featuring Ashton Kutcher.
- Between 2009 and 2011 Vanessa and Andreas Mattsson found time between other recording commitments to begin writing new songs and recording demo's in London and Stockholm later bringing in Robyn keyboardist/programmer Markus Jagerstedt to finalise production work on the second Vanessa & The O's album. Final mixes were again undertaken by Pelle Gunnerfeldt and Markus in Stockholm.
- March 2012, EMI Music released the James Iha cover version of the Vanessa & The O's song Till Next Tuesday, taken from Iha's second solo album Look To The Sky. The single peaked at number 8 on the Japan Billboard Hot 100.
- August 2012, the second Vanessa & The O's album Stories For Watering Skies is released by Bootrock Records in Japan only. The 11 track album available on CD and Digital download is listed by Tower Records Tokyo with a release date of August 8, 2012.
- April 2013 French label Grand Palais/Modulor released the single L'Air Entre Nous, taken from the European version of new album Stories For Watering Skies which features additional French language title Vivre. The album has been released in France and Europe the 16 April 2013 receiving rave reviews in the French press from Rock & Folk, Rock First and Magic. Rock & Folk's Nicolas Ungemuth had this to say (emphasis added):
  "...De loin, cette expatriee sort ce que Lou Doillon, Robi, Paradis et les autres ne sauront jamais faire. Noblesse oblige..un morceau comme 'Stepping Stones' par exemple. Qui en est capable? Comment cette jeune femme a la connaissance erudite et aux gouts impeccables, parvient-elle a se renouveler ainsi, renaitre de ses cendres, et signer a nouveau, tant d'aquarelles pop avec cet accent adorable? Peu de gens le savent et c'est tant mieux. Les miracles sont inexplicables, c'est pour cela qu'ils fascinent.”
  — Nicolas Ungemuth

== Discography ==
- Plus Rien (EP, 2003)
- La Ballade d' O (2005)
- La Ballade d'O Japanese version with 4 extra tracks (2006)
- We All Love Ennio Morricone (various artists, 2007)
- Filles Fragiles Vol 2 1 track (2008)
- La Ballade d'O Digital European version with 4 bonus tracks (2009)
- Paris Fashion District vol 2 2 tracks (2009)
- Supperclub - Adrenaline 1 track (2009)
- "Stories For Watering Skies" Japanese release album (August 2012)
- "L'Air Entre Nous" (Single, March 2013)
- "Stories For Watering Skies" European version (features extra title/tracklist/booklet) album April 2013
