= Love Has Left the Room =

2009 single by A Camp

Single by A Camp

from the album Colonia
- B-side: "Us and Them"; "Boys Keep Swinging"
- Released: 27 April 2009
- Genre: Pop
- Length: 3:39
- Label: Wigpowder; Reveal
- Songwriter(s): Niclas Frisk; Nina Persson; Nathan Larson
- Producer(s): A Camp

A Camp singles chronology
"Stronger Than Jesus" (2008)	"Love Has Left the Room" (2009)	"My America" (2009)

"Love Has Left the Room" is a song by Swedish band A Camp from its second studio album, Colonia (2009). It was released as the album's second single in Ireland and the United Kingdom on 27 April 2009 through Wigpowder and Reveal. The single includes cover versions of Pink Floyd's "Us and Them" (1973) and David Bowie's "Boys Keep Swinging" (1979).

== Background and release ==
"Love Has Left the Room" was written and produced by A Camp, consisting of Niclas Frisk, Nina Persson, and Nathan Larson, for the band's second studio album Colonia (2009). During an interview for Smålandsposten in November 2009, Frisk said the song was the best he had written. Geoff Sannoff served as recording engineer. The band is credited as producer of the track, and Larson also served as engineer. It was mixed by Al Weatherhead at Firehouse 12 in New Haven, Connecticut, and mastered by Fred Kevorkian at Kevorkian Mastering in New York City.

"Love Has Left the Room" was serviced as the second single from Colonia. The band's label Wigpowder released a digital extended play (EP) through Reveal on 27 April 2009 in Ireland and the United Kingdom. The release includes cover versions of Pink Floyd's "Us and Them" (1973) and David Bowie's "Boys Keep Swinging" (1979). In an interview for The Denver Post, Persson spoke of the decision to cover the two songs: the band felt "Us and Them" was "musically and rhythmically" related to their own work, while "Boys Keep Swinging" made "all the sense in the world to sing as a girl". Both covers were also released as part of the EP Covers in June 2009.

"Love Has Left the Room" was not released as a single in Scandinavia; instead, "My America" was released there as the album's second single in May 2009.

== Composition and lyrics ==
"Love Has Left the Room" is a country-tinged pop song with string instrumentation. Ricardo Baca, writing for The Denver Post, described the song as "chamber pop-styled". According to Thomas Britt of PopMatters, the song begins in a "girl-group groove" and includes occasional synthesizer effects "resembling the sound of a spaceship landing in an old science fiction film". Håkan Pettersson of Nerikes Allehanda compared the song to the works of ABBA, and Johanna Paulsson of Dagens Nyheter regarded it as "orchestrated 60s pop" and likened Persson's vocal performance to Sandie Shaw and Petula Clark. Sal Cinquemani of Slant Magazine considered the lyrics cynical, Andy Peterson of Contactmusic wrote that it portrays a "disconsolate virago" with lines such as "The party is over, but I can't get sober, obsession is tolling me deep down, down." Regarding the song's theme and inspiration, Persson told Stereogum:

Well, I really think that a lot of traces remain after love has left the room, and the song is about a love that left without a really clear ending, so that's probably even worse! No closure ... sucks. But in my experience, love can certainly also disappear completely.

== Reception ==
Mark Horne of the Lancashire Telegraph wrote positively of the song, "Persson belts out the melancholy lyrics in rich, full tones, and the catchy upbeat tune should win you over by the second chorus." Reviewers from Norra Skåne and Smålandsposten regarded it one of the best tracks on Colonia. Yahoo! Music's Dan Gennoe wrote that the song "manage[s] to be suitably off kilter while sounding like music they want the whole world to hear. Iain Moffat of The Quietus used the song as an example of a "terribly grown-up approach" yielding "notable rewards". Moffat concluded, "'Love Has Left the Room' mines the kind of poignant retro seam in which Richard Hawley's well and truly set up camp for some years now."

Stuart Murdoch of Belle and Sebastian included the song in a piece for Pitchfork about "music that made an impact on them throughout their lives". Murdoch wrote, "It's one of those songs where you don't know where it came from, you don't know if it was a single, you can't remember where you heard it, but you're looking around and thinking, 'This is the greatest thing that's ever been recorded! Why wasn't it a hit?'"

Although the single was not released in Sweden, the song managed to peak at number 15 on the Trackslistan radio chart.

== Music video ==
Sarah Sophie Flicker and Maximilla Lukacs directed the music video for "Love Has Left the Room". It premiered on 31 July 2009 via Stereogum. The video was shot using Super 8 film on location on the North Fork of Long Island, New York. A writer from Under the Radar wrote, "The video makes reference to the work of Maya Deren a female avante garde filmmaker who made some seminal pieces in the '40s. There's also a little bit of Roxy Music's Siren in some of these shots."

== Track listing ==
- Digital EP
1. "Love Has Left the Room" – 3:39
2. "Us and Them" – 7:00
3. "Boys Keep Swinging" – 3:55

== Credits and personnel ==
Credits are adapted from the Colonia liner notes and Tidal.

- A Camp – production
- Niclas Frisk – songwriting
- Nina Persson – songwriting
- Nathan Larson – songwriting, engineering, studio personnel
- Al Weatherhead – mixing, studio personnel
- Geoff Sanoff – recording, studio personnel
- Fred Kevorkian – mastering

== Charts ==
Chart performance for "Love Has Left the Room"
Chart (2009)	Peak position
Sweden (Trackslistan)	15
