= Colonia (A Camp album) =

Studio album by A Camp
- Released: 28 January 2009
- Recorded: April 2007 – August 2008
- Genre: Alternative
- Labels: Universal (Scandinavia); Reveal Records (Europe); Nettwerk (US/Canada)
- Producers: Nina Persson; Nathan Larson; Niclas Frisk

A Camp chronology
A Camp (2001)	Colonia (2009)	Covers (2009)

Singles from Colonia
- 1. "Stronger Than Jesus" Released: 17 November 2008; 2. "Love Has Left the Room" Released: 27 April 2009; 3. "My America" Released: 25 May 2009

Colonia is the second studio album by A Camp, the collaborative side project between The Cardigans vocalist Nina Persson, her husband, composer Nathan Larson and former Atomic Swing guitarist Niclas Frisk. The album was released on 28 January 2009 in Scandinavia by Universal and in the UK and mainland Europe by independent British label Reveal Records on 2 February and 20 March respectively, while in the United States the album was released through Nettwerk on 28 April 2009.

"Stronger Than Jesus" was released as the first single from Colonia on 19 January 2009. In Sweden, the song spent eleven weeks on the Sverigetopplistan chart, eventually peaking at number 8, making it their most successful single to date in the region. "Love Has Left the Room" was released as the second single in the UK and Ireland, while "My America" became the second Swedish single.

An EP of outtakes, Covers, was released in digital format on 9 June 2009 in support of the album.

== Background and production ==
Following the release of A Camp's self-titled debut album in 2001 and subsequent tours, Persson returned to her position as front-woman with The Cardigans for the release of Long Gone Before Daylight (2003) and Super Extra Gravity (2005). When the band ceased all promotional activities following a South American festival tour in September 2006, Persson decided to revisit the A Camp project with the view of releasing a new studio album by 2008.

"We were talking about the strange phenomenon of colonialism, with Europeans going around the world claiming every place as their own. We were obsessing about that, interested in the aesthetic—it's grossly alluring. I've been to Africa, but never in my life have I thought it would be an inspiration. We thought of the word "colonia" because we had a fantasy that the record would provide a smell for each song—like a cologne. Like how some people see colors when they hear music. All of our fantasies would somehow be summed up in a word."

— Nina Persson on the meaning behind the title Colonia.

The initial demo sessions were met with frustration, however, when Persson struggled to find the right framework to produce a new A Camp record, with Persson admitting "[the first A Camp album] was like my perfect country record. I didn't want this one to sound anything like the first, because that would have cheapened it. And I didn't want it to sound like a Cardigans album. It took a long time to work out what to do next and figure out what songs would be suitable. I ended up going back in time for the answer."

Professional ratings
Review scores
Source	Rating
AllMusic	3/5 stars
The A.V. Club	C
BBC Music	(favourable)
Entertainment Weekly	C+
Paste	8.7/10
Pitchfork	6.7/10
PopMatters	5/10 stars
Slant Magazine	3.5/5 stars
Spin	3.5/5 stars
Yahoo! Music	8/10 stars

Inspiration came following a safari trip to South Africa in early 2007. "I went there specifically to get away from writing songs, but being among the lions made me think of an old-fashioned empire - and that led to the idea of the decadence of old kings and queens."

The recording of a second A Camp album was officially confirmed by Persson in an interview with Swedish newspaper Dagens Nyheter in May 2007. The interview stated that, mere weeks after recording had started, half a dozen backing tracks were completed and that these were "going to get lyrics about everything from Chinatown in New York to animals in Africa," while the sound of the album was said to be inspired by "girl-pop from the 60's, 80's punk and David Bowie," but Persson made particular mention of Adam Ant, indicating that a cover of his song "Prince Charming" may be included.

The process of recording was undertaken by more that of "a proper band" [in comparison to the first A Camp record], as Persson "realised touring the first A Camp that I hate being thought of as a solo artist. It's too lonely. I've grown up in a band, and I need people around me." Persson, along with Atomic Swing founder Niclas Frisk and Persson's husband, former Shudder To Think guitarist Nathan Larson, constructed the majority of the backing tracks. "I made Nathan audition," Persson once said jokingly in an interview. The core group of musicians was rounded out by Kevin March, who performed drums on the majority of the album, and whom Nathan had worked with previously as a member of Shudder To Think.

Of the duet with Swedish singer Nicolai Dunger, Persson has said "I love the idea of duets, but too many are simple love songs. I don't understand that - you know the singers aren't going to fuck, so it feels fake and cheesy. But I'd thought for a long time my voice would work well with Nicolai."

Among the many notable guest musicians who contributed to the album are Joan Wasser, former Smashing Pumpkins guitarist James Iha and classically trained cello player Jane Scarpantoni, who had previously worked with artists such as Bruce Springsteen, Patti Smith, Sheryl Crow, R.E.M., Lou Reed and 10,000 Maniacs. Sparklehorse's Mark Linkous, who produced the majority of the first A Camp record, makes an appearance on slide guitar on album closer "The Weed Had Got There First." When asked why he wasn't at the helm of this record also, Persson replied, "because he didn't need to. Once the songs finally came, we wanted to get going. I love Mark, but obviously he's a busy man. And with the three of us producing, it helps send out the message: A Camp is now a band. A fucking great one too."

== Track listing ==
All songs written and composed by Niclas Frisk, Nina Persson and Nathan Larson.

No.	Title	Length
1.	"The Crowning"	3:45
2.	"Stronger Than Jesus"	3:05
3.	"Bear on the Beach"	4:11
4.	"Love Has Left the Room"	3:39
5.	"Golden Teeth and Silver Medals" (featuring Nicolai Dunger)	4:41
6.	"Here are Many Wild Animals"	3:53
7.	"Chinatown"	4:43
8.	"My America"	3:12
9.	"Eau de Colonia"	0:29
10.	"I Signed the Line"	2:57
11.	"It's Not Easy to Be Human"	2:35
12.	"The Weed Had Got There First"	6:39
13.	"Sympathy for Ned Merrill" (Bonus track, digital release)	4:44
Total length:		48:23

== Personnel ==
- Nina Persson – vocals, piano, toy piano and drum loops
- Nathan Larson – electric, acoustic and bass guitars, keyboards, synthesizers, drum loops, backing vocals and additional mixing
- Niclas Frisk – electric and acoustic guitars, piano, organ, drum loops and backing vocals
- Kevin March – drums and percussion

Additional personnel

- Nicolai Dunger – vocals on "Golden Teeth and Silver Medals"
- Mark Linkous – slide guitar on "The Weed Had Got There First"
- James Iha – electric guitars
- Joan Wasser – violin and viola
- Jane Scarpantoni – cello
- Cat Martino – backing vocals and casiotone
- Anna Ternheim – backing vocals
- Jon Natchez – horns and woodwinds
- Kelly Pratt – horns and woodwinds

Technical personnel

- Geoff Sanoff – recording
- Al Weatherhead – mixing
- Fred Kevorkian – mastering

Design personnel

- Åbäke – artwork and design

== Charts and certifications ==
=== Album ===
Chart (2009)	Peak position
Swedish Albums (Sverigetopplistan)	2
UK Albums (OCC)	114
UK Independent Albums (Official Charts)	10
US Top Heatseekers (Billboard)	22

=== Singles ===
Year	Single	Chart	Position
2009	"Stronger Than Jesus"	Sweden (Sverigetopplistan)	8

=== Certifications ===
Region	Provider	Certification	Shipment(s)
Sweden	IFPI Sweden	Gold	20,000

== Release history ==
Region	Date	Label	Format	Catalog
Scandinavia	28 January 2009	Universal	CD	0-6025-17918-7-7
Ireland	30 January 2009	Reveal	CD/LP	Reveal50CD/LP
United Kingdom	2 February 2009	Reveal	CD/LP	Reveal50CD/LP
Mainland Europe	20 March 2009	Reveal	CD/LP	Reveal50CD/LP
United States	28 April 2009	Nettwerk	CD	0-6700-30838-2-9
