= Song for the Leftovers =

Single by A Camp

from the album A Camp
- B-side: "Train of Salvation"; "My Misery Is a Mystery"; "Such a Bad Comedown"
- Released: 12 November 2001
- Length: 3:33
- Label: Stockholm
- Songwriters: Nina Persson; Niclas Frisk
- Producer: Mark Linkous

A Camp singles chronology
"I Can Buy You" (2001)	"Song for the Leftovers" (2001)	"Stronger Than Jesus" (2008)

"Song for the Leftovers" is a song by A Camp, the solo project by the Cardigans lead vocalist Nina Persson. The song was released on 12 November 2001 through Stockholm as the second and final single from the project's debut studio album A Camp (2001).

== Background ==
In 1998, Nina Persson began working on her solo project A Camp with Niclas Frisk. After recording several songs at Silence Studio in Koppom, the project was put on hold. In 2001, Persson re-recorded the tracks in New York City with Frisk, Nathan Larson and producer Mark Linkous. In an interview for Dagens Nyheter, explained that "Song for the Leftovers" is about when Persson and Frisk both felt "lost". The ballad includes the line "You're not what I was after, but I'm happy with what I found".

"Song for the Leftovers" was released on 12 November 2001 through Stockholm as a CD single. The release includes the previously unreleased B-sides "Train of Salvation" and "My Misery Is a Mystery".

== Reception ==
"Song for the Leftovers" received positive reviews. Håkan Steen of Aftonbladet named it one of the best songs on A Camp. AllMusic's Tim DiGravina also declared it a highlight on the album.

"Song for the Leftovers" did not chart on Sverigetopplistan. It peaked at number 14 on the Trackslistan radio chart.

== Formats and track listing ==
- CD single
1. "Song for the Leftovers" (radio version) – 3:33
2. "Train of Salvation" – 5:10
- Maxi CD single
1. "Song for the Leftovers" (radio version) – 3:33
2. "Train of Salvation" – 5:10
3. "My Misery Is a Mystery" – 2:22
4. "Such a Bad Comedown" (version 1, the 1998 recording) – 3:55

== Credits and personnel ==
Credits are adapted from the A Camp liner notes.

- Nina Persson – songwriting
- Niclas Frisk – songwriting
- Mark Linkous – production
- Tore Johansson – mixing
- Al Weatherhead – engineering
- Björn Engelmann – mastering

== Charts ==
Chart performance for "Song for the Leftovers"
Chart (2001)	Peak position
Sweden (Trackslistan)	14
