= Big Girls Don't Cry (2002 film) =

2002 film by Maria von Heland

- Theatrical release poster
- German: Große Mädchen weinen nicht
- Directed by: Maria von Heland
- Written by: Maria von Heland
- Produced by: Judy Tossell
- Starring: Anna Maria Mühe; Karoline Herfurth; Josefine Domes; David Winter; Tillbert Strahl-Schäfer; Stefan Kurt; Nina Petri; Gabriela Maria Schmeide; Matthias Brandt; Teresa Harder; Dieter Laser
- Cinematography: Roman Osin
- Edited by: Jessica Congdon
- Music by: Niclas Frisk; Andreas Mattsson
- Production companies: Deutsche Columbia Pictures Filmproduktion; Egoli Tossell Film
- Distributed by: Columbia TriStar Film Distributors International
- Release dates: 22 September 2002 (SSIFF); 24 October 2002 (Germany)
- Running time: 87 minutes
- Country: Germany
- Language: German

Big Girls Don't Cry (German: Große Mädchen weinen nicht) is a 2002 German teen drama film written and directed by Maria von Heland. It tells the story of two teenage girls in Berlin, one of whom takes revenge on the daughter of her father's lover. A subplot involves a third girl who drifts into pornography and comes to a bad end.

== Plot ==
Kati and Steffi, inseparable since childhood, are teenagers at school. Kati endures a modest and difficult home life with a neurotic mother, but Steffi's family are well off and harmonious. Everything changes when in a night club the two see Steffi's father entwined with another woman. Furious at this treachery, Steffi plots revenge against the woman's daughter Tessa. First she sends the girl to audition for a band, but it emerges that she can sing well and the band like her. That having failed, Steffi sends her to the pornographer Winter, having got the address from a schoolmate Yvonne, who posed to earn some money so that she could leave home. Kati gets worried over Steffi's obsessive behaviour and, tracking down Tessa, rescues her as the pornographer tries to rape her, then reveals why Steffi had sent her to him.

Furious after Tessa tells her, Tessa's mother storms round to the home of Steffi's parents and tells them what's been going on, upon which Steffi's mother leaves home. In the meantime, a nationwide police search has been launched for the missing Yvonne. Suspecting the pornographer, Kati recounts all she knows to the police, who tell her Yvonne has in fact been murdered. Going to see Steffi, she tells her that it was she who saved Tessa and so triggered the crisis in Steffi's family. When Steffi does not appear at school next day, Kati breaks into her home to find she has slashed both wrists. By calling an ambulance, Kati saves her life and at the hospital Steffi's parents turn up, apparently reconciled. Kati's mother at last shows sympathy towards her daughter and in a final shot the recovering Steffi makes it up with Kati.

== Cast ==
- Anna Maria Mühe as Kati
- Karoline Herfurth as Steffi
- David Winter as Carlos
- Josefine Domes as Tessa
- Tillbert Strahl-Schäfer as Klaus
- Jennifer Ulrich as Yvonne
- Nina Petri as Ann, Steffi's mother
- Stefan Kurt as Hans, Steffi's father
- Teresa Harder as Jeanette, Tessa's mother
- Matthias Brandt as Jost, Kati's father
- Gabriela Maria Schmeide as Ingrid, Kati's mother
- Dieter Laser as Herr Winter (Mr. Winter)
