= I Can Buy You =

Single by A Camp

from the album A Camp
- B-side: "Charlie Charlie"; "Angel of Sadness" (Out on the Porch version)
- Released: 27 June 2001
- Genre: Country pop
- Length: 3:50
- Label: Stockholm; Universal
- Songwriter(s): Niclas Frisk; Nina Persson
- Producer(s): Mark Linkous

A Camp singles chronology
"I Can Buy You" (2001)	"Song for the Leftovers" (2001)

"I Can Buy You" is a song by A Camp, the solo project by the Cardigans lead vocalist Nina Persson. The song was released on 27 June 2001 through Stockholm and Universal as the first single from the project's debut studio album A Camp (2001).

The song peaked at number 17 on the Sverigetopplistan singles chart and reached number 46 on the UK Singles Chart.

== Background and composition ==
"I Can Buy You" was written by Nina Persson and Niclas Frisk, and produced by Mark Linkous. It was released in Sweden on 27 June 2001 through Stockholm and Universal as the first single from the project's debut studio album A Camp (2001).

"I Can Buy You" is a country pop song.

== Reception ==
At the time of its release, Håkan Steen of Aftonbladet graded the single three out of five points, writing that the song proves that Persson's vocals fit well with country pop guitars. Similarly, Per Hägred of Expressen deemed it a catchy country-flavoured pop song. Johan Lindqvist, writing for Göteborgs-Posten, predicted the song would be commercially successful thanks to its country sound and Persson's star quality.

== Formats and track listing ==
- CD single
1. "I Can Buy You" – 3:50
2. "Charlie Charlie" – 3:07
- Maxi CD single
1. "I Can Buy You" – 3:50
2. "Charlie Charlie" – 3:07
3. "Angel of Sadness" (Out on the Porch version) – 4:27
4. "Camplife" (part 1; video) – 3:45

== Credits and personnel ==
Credits are adapted from the A Camp liner notes.

- Nina Persson – songwriting
- Niclas Frisk – songwriting, harmonica
- Kevin March – drums, percussion
- Nathan Larson – bass, acoustic guitar, piano, hammond, steel guitar sequencer,
- Niko Röhlcke – steel guitar
- Mark Linkous – production, electric guitar, acoustic guitar, backing vocals, chamberlin
- Karl Berger – string arrangements, string conducting
- Julianne Klopotic – violin
- Jenny Scheinman – violin
- Julie Goodale – viola
- Julia Kent – cello
- Tore Johansson – mixing
- Al Weatherhead – engineering
- Björn Engelmann – mastering

== Charts ==
Chart performance for "I Can Buy You"
Chart (2001)	Peak position
Netherlands (Single Top 100)	85
Sweden (Sverigetopplistan)	17
UK Singles (OCC)	46
