= Idol 2022 (Sweden) =

- Season 2022
- Hosted by: Pär Lernström; Anis Don Demina
- Judges: Kishti Tomita; Alexander Kronlund; Katia Mosally; Anders Bagge
- Winner: Nike Sellmar
- Runner-up: Albin Tingwall
- Finals venue: Tele2 Arena, Stockholm, Sweden

Release
- Original network: TV4
- Original release: 22 August – 25 November 2022

Season chronology
- ← Previous; Season 2021 Next → Season 2023

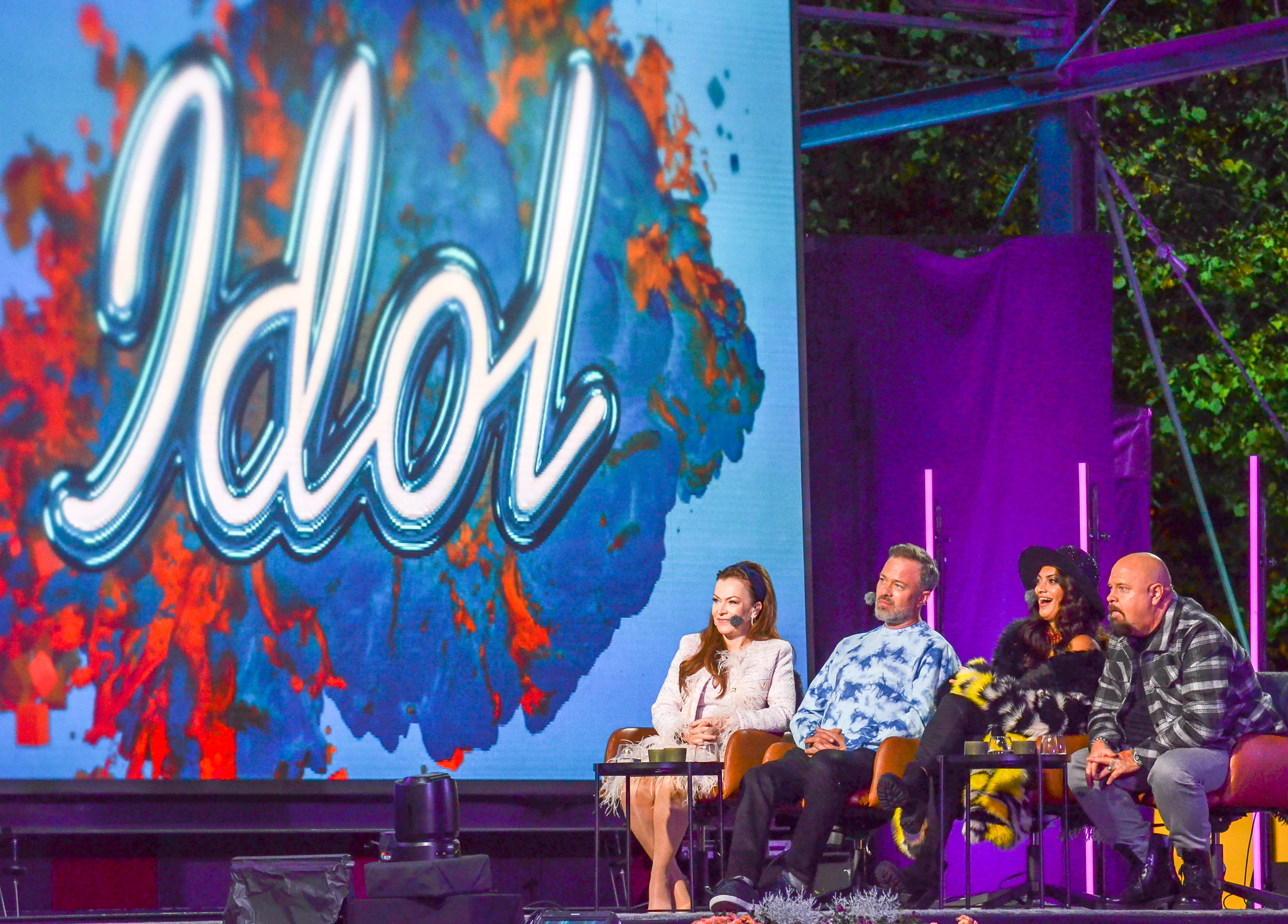
The jury for Idol 2022: Kishti Tomita, Alexander Kronlund, Katia Mosally, and Anders Bagge

Idol 2022 was the eighteenth season of the Swedish Idol series. The show was broadcast on TV4 and started on 22 August 2022, and then ended with a final on 25 November. Pär Lernström continued as presenter of the show with Anis Don Demina as co-presenter. The judges from the last season all returned.

Winner of this season was singer Nike Sellmar.

== Competition ==
=== Elimination chart ===
Stadium:		Qualification week						Weekly finals									Final
Date:		19/9	20/9	21/9	22/9	23/9		30/9	7/10	14/10	21/10	28/10	4/11	11/11	18/11		25/11
Place	Contestants	Results															
1	Nike Sellmar																Winner
2	Albin Tingwall	3:rd				WC 1	11:th										Runner-up
3	Klara Almström															Eliminated	
4	Sebastian Rydgren											6:th		4:th	Eliminated		
5	Luka Nemorin								8:th	7:th	7:th		5:th	Eliminated			
6	Ida Hallquist										6:th	5:th	Eliminated				
7-8	Julien Keulen											Eliminated					
7-8	Ruby Lindén			3:rd		WC 5		9:th		8:th	Saved	Eliminated					
9	Caroline Ellingsen								9:th	Eliminated							
10	Carmen Toubia		3:rd			WC 2		10:th	Eliminated								
11	Vera Arkelid Jalméus	3:rd				WC 4		Eliminated									
12-13	Arvid Einarsson						Eliminated										
12-13	Neville Ristenfeldt				3:rd	WC 3	Eliminated										
Top; 24	Anton Älvstrand				3:rd												
Top; 24	Than Tamthong				3:rd												
Top; 24	Vanessa Rose				3:rd												
Top; 24	Amadeus Hallström			3:rd													
Top; 24	Linus Johansson			3:rd													
Top; 24	Sanna Ekdahl Akanni			3:rd													
Top; 24	Angelina Terennikova		3:rd														
Top; 24	Emil Westermark		3:rd														
Top; 24	Sebastian Hautamäki		3:rd														
Top; 24	Amanda Andersson	3:rd															
Top; 24	Espen Edberg	3:rd															

Legend
Women	Men	Safe	Not Safe / Bottom 2 / Bottom 3 / Bottom 4	Wild Card	Judges Save	Eliminated

Top 11	Top 24	Bottom 4	Stage not reached

=== Top 13 ===
Order	Contestant	Song	Result
1	Klara Almström	"You Can't Hurry Love"	Safe
2	Albin Tingwall	"Human Nature"	Bottom three
3	Julien Keulen	"Lay Me Down"	Safe
4	Arvid Einarsson	"Ser du månen där du är ikväll? (Tillsammans igen)"	Eliminated
5	Sebastian Rydgren	"Leave a Light On"	Safe
6	Carmen Toubia	"Secret Love Song"	Safe
7	Caroline Ellingsen	"Have You Ever Seen the Rain?"	Safe
8	Neville Ristenfeldt	"I Love This Life"	Eliminated
9	Luka Nemorin	"Breathe Me"	Safe
10	Nike Sellmar	"Jolene"	Safe
11	Ida Hallquist	"Wild Enough"	Safe
12	Vera Arkelid Jalméus	"Emmylou"	Safe
13	Ruby Lindén	"Stand Up"	Safe

=== Top 11 - This is Me ===
Order	Contestant	Song	Result
1	Sebastian Rydgren	"It's a Sin"	Safe
2	Klara Almström	"Something's Got a Hold on Me"	Safe
3	Carmen Toubia	"Proud Mary"	Bottom three
4	Ida Hallquist	"Treat Myself"	Safe
5	Vera Arkelid Jalméus	"Somebody to Love"	Eliminated
6	Luka Nemorin	"Heaven"	Safe
7	Julien Keulen	"Don't Start Now"	Safe
8	Albin Tingwall	"Mirrors"	Safe
9	Nike Sellmar	"A Change Is Gonna Come"	Safe
10	Ruby Lindén	"Crazy in Love"	Bottom three
11	Caroline Ellingsen	"Highway to hell"	Safe

=== Top 10 - Blast from the Past ===
Order	Contestant	Song	Result
1	Albin Tingwall	"Tiny Dancer"	Safe
2	Nike Sellmar	"Rock and Roll"	Safe
3	Carmen Toubia	"Edge of Seventeen"	Eliminated
4	Klara Almström	"Forever Young"	Safe
5	Caroline Ellingsen	"You Give Love a Bad Name"	Bottom three
6	Luka Nemorin	"I Still Haven't Found What I'm Looking For"	Bottom three
7	Ida Hallquist	"Hero"	Safe
8	Julien Keulen	"You Oughta Know"	Safe
9	Ruby Lindén	"My Heart Will Go On"	Safe
10	Sebastian Rydgren	"Strong Enough"	Safe

=== Top 9 - Swedish Hits ===
Order	Contestant	Song	Result
1	Ruby Lindén	"Nån annan nu"	Bottom three
2	Ida Hallquist	"Stockholm i natt"	Safe
3	Julien Keulen	"En säng av rosor"	Safe
4	Luka Nemorin	"Forever young"	Bottom three
5	Caroline Ellingsen	"Lyckligare nu"	Eliminated
6	Nike Sellmar	"Öppna landskap"	Safe
7	Sebastian Rydgren	"Sista morgonen"	Safe
8	Albin Tingwall	"Strövtåg i hembygden"	Safe
9	Klara Almström	"Här kommer natten"	Safe

=== Top 8 (first week) - Movie Night ===
Order	Contestant	Song	Result
1	Luka Nemorin	"I See Fire"	Bottom three
2	Nike Sellmar	"Running Up That Hill"	Safe
3	Sebastian Rydgren	"Life on Mars"	Safe
4	Ruby Lindén	"Circle of Life"	Judges Save
5	Klara Almström	"Skyfall"	Safe
6	Albin Tingwall	"It Must Have Been Love"	Safe
7	Ida Hallquist	"Kiss Me"	Bottom three
8	Julien Keulen	"The Show Must Go On"	Safe

=== Top 8 (second week) - Duets ===
Order	Contestant	Song	Result
1	Julien Keulen	"Run to the Hills" (with Klara Hammarström)	Eliminated
2	Albin Tingwall	"Vänner" (with Myra Granberg)	Safe
3	Ruby Lindén	"Lämna han" (with Cherrie)	Eliminated
4	Luka Nemorin	"Be Alright" (with Dean Lewis)	Safe
5	Ida Hallquist	"Röda trådens slut" (with Oscar Magnusson)	Bottom four
6	Sebastian Rydgren	"Stay the Night" (with Lina Hedlund)	Bottom four
7	Klara Almström	"Just idag känns du nära (Saras sång)" (with Tomas Andersson Wij)	Safe
8	Nike Sellmar	"Sånt är livet" (with Anne-Lie Rydé)	Safe

=== Top 6 – Release Day & Judge's Choice ===
Order	Contestant	First song	Order	Second song	Result
1	Nike Sellmar	"With a Little Help from My Friends"	7	"Celebrity Skin"	Safe
2	Sebastian Rydgren	"Holding Out For a Hero"	8	"Hang with Me"	Safe
3	Albin Tingwall	"How Am I Supposed to Live Without You"	9	"Free Fallin'"	Safe
4	Luka Nemorin	"Bruises"	10	"Impossible"	Bottom two
5	Ida Hallquist	"Hatar dig"	11	"Show Me Love"	Eliminated
6	Klara Almström	"Hopelessly Devoted to You"	12	"Fields of Gold"	Safe

=== Top 5 – Love ===
Order	Contestant	First song	Order	Second song	Result
1	Sebastian Rydgren	"Frozen"	6	"Gold"	Bottom two
2	Klara Almström	"Du måste finnas"	7	"What a Wonderful World"	Safe
3	Luka Nemorin	"Smile"	8	"Everybody's Changing"	Eliminated
4	Nike Sellmar	"Make You Feel My Love"	9	"Babel"	Safe
5	Albin Tingwall	"Fix You"	10	"My Way"	Safe

=== Top 4 – Semifinal ===
Order	Contestant	First song	Result	Order	Second song	Result
1	Nike Sellmar	"The Story"	Safe	5	"Hard Times"	Safe
2	Albin Tingwall	"Tenerife Sea"	Safe	6	"As It Was"	Safe
3	Klara Almström	"Rosa himmel"	Safe	7	"Jag kommer"	Eliminated
4	Sebastian Rydgren	"Enjoy the Silence"	Eliminated	N/A (already eliminated)		

=== Top 2 – Final: Free Choice, Da Capo & Winner's Single ===
Order	Act	Free Choice Song	Order	Da Capo Song	Order	Winner's Single	Result
1	Nike Sellmar	"Happier Than Ever"	3	"To Make You Feel My Love"	5	"Anything You Say"	Winner
2	Albin Tingwall	"Falling"	4	"It Must Have Been Love"	6	"Anything You Say"	Runner-up
