= Vanessa Quinones =

French-British singer

Vanessa Contenay-Quinones (born Vanessa Lydia Eve Contenay in Paris, France) is a London-based singer-songwriter from Paris. She is a member of the band Vanessa and the O's and is currently releasing solo records in collaboration with UK based duo Skeewiff, under the name Vanessa Contenay-Quinones. She was also briefly known as Vanessa St. James in 2002–03 working with Brian Higgins and Nick Coler (as the duo Mr. Joshua), and Lou Reed.

== Early life ==
Contenay-Quinones is the daughter of Carmen Quinones, a painter from Lima, Peru. She was influenced by a wide variety of music early in life with the sounds of 1950s/60s rock & roll and pop being predominant. She was born in Paris, but spent her early childhood in the Canary Islands, returning to Paris to attend primary school. She released her first pop record at the age of 16 in France before moving to England to start her music career proper, settling first in Brighton, absorbing the electronic dance music culture and starting up Latin-infused pop duo Espiritu with Chris Taplin (of Frazier Chorus), before moving to London.

== Career ==
In 1992, Vanessa and Taplin signed a recording contract with Heavenly Records (then in a distribution deal with Arista Records, subsidiary of Sony Music) and released a number of singles as Espiritu. Their debut single, "Francisca" (remixed by Farley & Heller) was followed by three UK Top 50 entries: "Conquistador" (remixed by The Sabres of Paradise), "Los Americanos" (remixed by Mother) and "Bonita Manana", also remixed by The Sabres of Paradise.

An album called Manifesto was announced, but did not appear, due to Sony ending its distribution deal with Heavenly. However a remix of the Bacharach and David song, "Always Something There to Remind Me" (credited to Tin Tin Out and featuring Espiritu), went to #14 on the UK Singles Chart, while the original version of the single (without Tin Tin Out) reached #1 in Japan. The Manifesto tracks were then licensed to the Japanese Toshiba-EMI label, and the first Sony Espiritu album, retitled Always..., was subsequently released in Japan in 1995.

Drum and bass influences were to be found on the next three (more underground) Espiritu singles, and on the second album Another Life, released after re-signing with Heavenly (then newly acquired by Deconstruction Records). Espiritu and Deconstruction Records parted company after lack of commercial success (and citing "too underground for mass consumer taste"). Deconstruction Records folded not long after.

In 1999, a cover of the Carly Simon song "Why" was released on EMI Music Germany. In 2000, Quinones provided vocals on the Dario G song "Voices" on the soundtrack to the Leonardo DiCaprio film The Beach.

In 2001, the (Cream Records) song, "In Praise of the Sun" was released by the Mr. Joshua presents Espiritu (of Brian Higgins/Xenomania) collaboration, co-written by Nick Bracegirdle, better known as the dance artist Chicane. Subsequently, Espiritu was recruited to re-record the song for the 2003 Chicane album Easy to Assemble.

=== Vanessa and the O's ===
A 2003 meeting in Manhattan with James Iha (formerly of the Smashing Pumpkins), Andreas Mattson (of Popsicle), and Niclas Frisk (of Atomic Swing) resulted in the formation of the band Vanessa and the O's and the release of the limited edition EP Plus Rien.

In 2004, Vanessa recorded an electro/dance version of the Velvet Underground classic "Sunday Morning" with Lou Reed and released by Warner Bros Germany.

In 2005, Vanessa and the O's released their debut album La Ballade d'O via EMI Records Sweden in Scandinavia only.

In 2006, the La Ballade d'O album was released in Japan by Strange Days Records, in France by Pias, and in Thailand by SmallRoom Records. The album was also made available worldwide digitally via Rushmore Recordings, the band's own label. Vanessa appears as guest vocalist on the Scott Walker album The Drift.

In 2007, Vanessa and the O's contributed a track to the tribute album We All Love Ennio Morricone (see Ennio Morricone) with an update of the Francois Hardy 60's classic "Je Changerais d'Avis".

March 2012, James Iha's version of Vanessa & The O's song 'Till Next Tuesday' was released by EMI Music reaching number 8 on the Japanese top 10 singles chart. Taken from his solo album 'Look to the Sky' featuring Nina Persson and Television's Tom Verlaine.

August 2012 saw the release of the second Vanessa & the O's album 'Stories For Watering Skies' in Japan only.

February 2013, release of the single 'L'Air Entre Nous' taken from the European version of the new Vanessa and the O's album which was released by Modulor/Grand Palais Paris on 15 April 2013.

=== Vanessa Contenay-Quinones presents Allez Pop! ===
In 2008–2010, Quinones created the solo project Vanessa presents Allez Pop! with London-based producers Alex Rizzo and Elliot Ireland (of the duo Skeewiff) and released a '60s French pop-inspired analogue recorded album. Original songs from these sessions titled "C'est Magnifique", "Pres de Toi", "Bon Bon Bon", "Quand Tu Me Dis", "Pour Quoi Pas" and "Odyssee" are now available on various compilation albums worldwide, such as Paris Fashion District Volume 2/3 (cool:division Italy), Filles Fragile2 (Zyx – Holland), Cafe De Paris (HiNote Records – Beijing/China), and Musique Fantastique (Netherlands).

The June 2010 Allez Pop! track "Bon Bon Bon" was featured in the action-comedy film, Killers (a.k.a. Kiss & Kill in France), starring Ashton Kutcher, Katherine Heigl and Tom Selleck. The album, Killers, hit the US box-office top 3 in its week of release in June 2010.

May 2011, "Pourquoi Pas", another track taken from Vanessa's solo French pop album Vanessa presents Allez Pop! appeared on the Pschent label compilation L'Alcazar.

June 2011, Quinones released a specially written song "Show Me How" for the Vinyl Japan/Red Cross charity album for children orphaned by the March 2011 disaster, titled Omoiyari for Japan alongside Tom Verlaine, The Divine Comedy and others.

In September 2013, the Contenay-Quinones/Skeewiff production Bon Bon Bon was used in the Victoria's Secret online campaign for "The Fragrance". As well as wide usage across a variety of Buzz Feed clips.

A new album, Made in France in the '60s French pop series (Allez Pop!) again made in conjunction with Skeewiff was released September 2014 on the Pedigree Cuts label to further critical acclaim in France and the title "Langue Au Chat" picking up many international synch usages.

After an extended musical hiatus following personal tragedy and the loss of loved ones Vanessa re-emerged with the third 'Allez Pop' album Voodoo Girl in March 2020, again a Skeewiff collaboration released via Pedigree Cuts worldwide. The first single "Voodoo Girl" was released In March 2020 picking up plays on French radio. A second single is expected in autumn 2020.

== See also ==
- DJ Cam
- Willy Denzey
- Sidney Duteil
- Abd al Malik (rapper)
