= The Dewey Decimal System =

The Dewey Decimal System may refer to:

- The Dewey Decimal System (novel)
- Dewey Decimal Classification, system for classifying library books
