= Människor som du och jag =

Studio album by Peter Jöback
- Released: 19 September 2007
- Genre: musical, pop
- Length: 50 minutes
- Label: King Island Roxystars Recordings
- Producer: Peter Kvint

Peter Jöback chronology
Cabaret - liveupptagning från musikalen (2007)	Människor som du och jag (2007)	Himlen är inget tak (2008)

Människor som du och jag is a studio album by Peter Jöback, released 19 September 2007.

== Track listing ==
1. Intro
2. Balladen om det angenäma livet
3. Han är med mig nu (with Annika Norlin)
4. Stockholm i natt
5. Charlies tema
6. Sen du åkte bort
7. Inget vi får vill gå på toa
8. Hur hamnade jag här
9. Jag sjöng varje sång för dig
10. Under morgonljuset
11. Stoppa mig
12. Jag ångrar ingenting jag gjort
13. Tänk om jag hade fel
14. Juni, juli, augusti

== Contributors ==
- Peter Jöback - vocals, vibraphone, tubular bells, composer, lyrics
- Andreas Mattsson guitar, composer, lyrics
- Niclas Frisk - guitar, composer, lyrics
- Ricard Nettermalm - drums, percussion, guitar
- Rickard Nilsson - organ, spinet, piano, wurlitzer, celesta, synthesizer, piano
- Sven Lindvall - bass
- Peter Kvint - producer
- Svea Strings - musicians

== Chart positions ==
Chart (2006–2007)	Peak positions
Norway	12
Sweden	2
