= Alex Mar =

American journalist, writer, and documentary filmmaker

- Writing career
- Genres: Memoir, essays
- Notable works: Seventy Times Seven, American Mystic, Witches of America

Alex Mar is an American journalist, writer, and documentary filmmaker based in the Hudson Valley and New York City. Her work often centers on religion, belief systems, and subcultures. Her books include Seventy Times Seven: A True Story of Murder and Mercy and Witches of America.

== Films ==
Mar's film American Mystic premiered at the Tribeca Film Festival in 2010. Five years in the making, the film focuses on three members of fringe religious communities: Morpheus, a Pagan priestess building a spiritual sanctuary in rural California; Kublai, a Spiritualist medium working on a farm in upstate New York; and Chuck, a Lakota Sioux, raising his family according to his ancestors' way of life.

== Writing ==
Mar's first book, Witches of America, was published in 2015. It was a New York Times Notable Book for 2015.

The book is both a memoir and an exploration of contemporary occult practice in the United States. The book traces a brief history of contemporary occult practice, from Aleister Crowley and Ordo Templi Orientis to contemporary Gnostic Masses held in New Orleans. She also explores her personal relationship with Morpheus Ravenna, a Feri witch she met during the filming of American Mystic. In the book, Mar also takes on the spiritual training required to be initiated into the Feri tradition and explores her own relationship to mysticism and ritual, as the daughter of Cuban and Greek immigrants.

Her most recent book is Seventy Times Seven: A True Story of Murder and Mercy. It tells the story of a 15-year-old named Paula Cooper, who killed an elderly Bible teacher, Ruth Pelke, in a violent home invasion in Gary, Indiana, in 1985. Paula was sentenced to death for the crime, only to have her victim's grandson Bill Pelke decide to publicly forgive her and campaign to spare her life.

Mar's essays have appeared in The New York Times Book Review, The Believer, Wired, and the Oxford American. She has written about contemporary Catholic nuns in Houston, Texas; the Church of Satan; the "body farm" at the Forensic Anthropology Center (FACTS), Texas State University San Marcos, and the development of human-like androids in Japan. In 2018, she was nominated for a National Magazine Award for Feature Writing.
