= Covers (A Camp EP) =

Covers (EP)

EP by A Camp
- Released: 9 June 2009
- Recorded: 2007
- Genre: Alternative
- Length: 14:48
- Label: Nettwerk Records
- Producer: A Camp

A Camp chronology
Colonia (2009)	Covers (EP) (2009)

Professional ratings
Review scores
Source	Rating
Under The Radar	7/10 stars

Covers is an EP by Swedish alternative rock group A Camp, the side-project of The Cardigans vocalist Nina Persson. The three covers, recorded during the Colonia sessions along with another known but unreleased cover of "Prince Charming," was released exclusively through iTunes in the U.S. on 9 June 2009 before being made available at other digital retailers in the U.S. and throughout Europe one week later on 16 June 2009.

Two of the three tracks – "Boys Keep Swinging" and "Us and Them" – had previously been released in Europe as B-sides on the digital "Love Has Left The Room" single, which was also released in a physical format as a promo single. The remaining track, "I've Done It Again" was performed regularly on their European and U.S. tours in support of the album Colonia.

== Track listing ==
No.	Title	Length
1.	"Boys Keep Swinging" (David Bowie)	3:46
2.	"Us and Them" (Pink Floyd)	6:56
3.	"I've Done It Again" (written by Barry Reynolds and Marianne Faithfull, originally performed by Grace Jones)	3:54

== Release history ==
Country	Date
United States	9 June 2009
Europe	16 June 2009
