= Only When I Breathe =

Studio album by Peter Jöback
- Released: 20 September 2000
- Genre: musical, pop
- Length: circa 44 minutes
- Label: Sony

Peter Jöback chronology
Personliga val (1997)	Only When I Breathe (2000)	I Feel Good and I'm Worth It (2002)

Only When I Breathe is the third studio album by Swedish singer Peter Jöback. It was released on 20 September 2000. The album peaked at number one on the Swedish Albums Chart.

== Track listing ==
1. "Only When I Breathe" - 3:51
2. "Higher" - 3:44
3. "Because" - 4:21
4. "I" - 4:23
5. "Under My Skin" - 3:46
6. "The Man I Wanna Be" - 4:25
7. "Tonight" - 3:47
8. "Seeing Red" - 3:59
9. "Rain" - 4:11
10. "Sun" - 3:19
11. "Searching for Love" - 4:22

== Personnel ==
- Peter Jöback – vocals, organ
- Lasse Andersson – guitar, keyboards
- Tore Johansson – guitar, bass
- Rasmus Kihlberg – drums

== Charts ==
Chart (2000–2001)	Peak positions
Finnish Albums (Suomen virallinen lista)	28
Swedish Albums (Sverigetopplistan)	1
