= Flera sidor av samma man =

Compilation album by Peter Jöback
- Released: 5 July 2006
- Recorded: 1990–2006
- Genres: musical, soul pop, schlager
- Length: 2 hours, 47 minutes
- Label: Sony BMG Music Entertainment

Peter Jöback chronology
Storybook (2004)	Flera sidor av samma man (2006)	Cabaret - liveupptagning från musikalen (2007)

Flera sidor av samma man was released on 5 July 2006, and is a Peter Jöback compilation album. Despite being released in mid-year, the album became the most sold in Sweden of 2006.

== Track listing ==
=== CD 1 ===
1. Jag står för allt jag gjort
2. En sång om oss
3. Tonight
4. Du har förlorat mer än jag
5. Sinner
6. Under My Skin
7. Gå inte förbi (duet with Sissel Kyrkjebø)
8. Gör Det Nu
9. Heal
10. Är det här platsen
11. She
12. I
13. Vem ser ett barn?
14. Varför Gud?
15. I'm Gonna Do It
16. Det måste finnas bättre liv än det här/på väg
17. Guldet blev till sand

=== CD 2 ===
1. Jag blundar i Solens sken
2. Sommarens sista sång
3. Jag bär dig (duet with Sara Isaksson)
4. Higher
5. I din blick
6. She's Like a Butterfly
7. Varje gång vi ses
8. I Who Have Nothing
9. I Don't Care Much
10. Mellan en far och en son
11. Always on My Mind
12. Undress Me
13. Only When I Breathe
14. Hon ser inte mig
15. Searching for Love
16. Decembernatt (halleluja)
17. En sensation (bonus track)

== Charts ==
Chart (2006–2007)	Peak positions
Norway (VG-lista)	5
Sweden (Sverigetopplistan)	1
