= Albin Tingwall =

Swedish singer

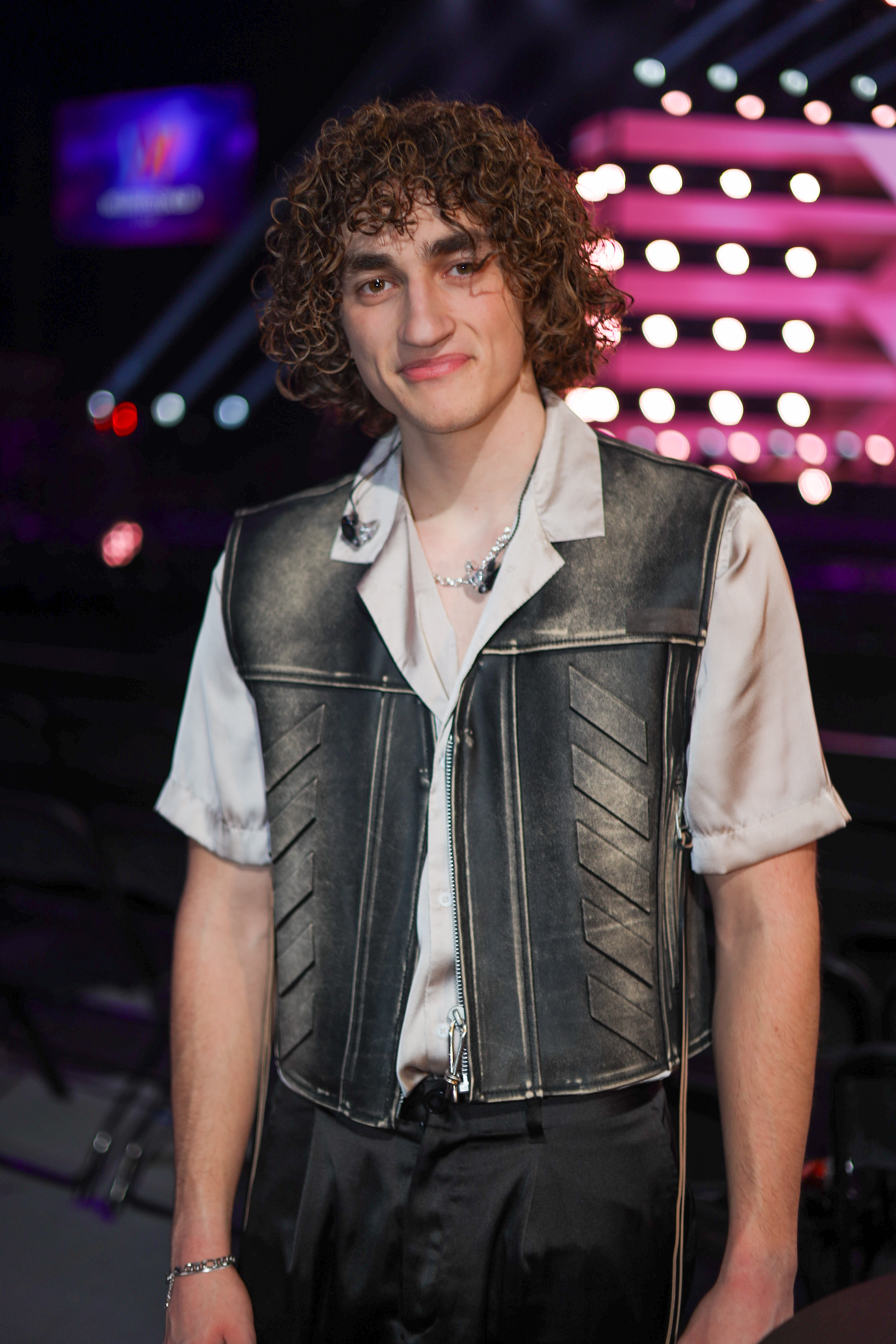
- Albin Tingwall in 2024

Background information
- Born: Olov Albin Tingwall; 25 July 2003 (age 22)
- Occupation: Singer

Olov Albin Tingwall (born 25 July 2003) is a Swedish singer. He participated in Idol 2022 on TV4, placing second in the final, and in Melodifestivalen 2024 with the song "Done Getting Over You", where it made it to the final qualification round.

== Discography ==
=== Charting singles ===
List of charting singles, with selected peak chart positions
Title	Year	Peak chart positions	Album
Title	Year	SWE	Album
"Done Getting Over You"	2024	39	Non-album single
