= Jag kommer hem igen till jul =

- Album cover

Studio album by Peter Jöback
- Released: 18 November 2002
- Recorded: Augusti 2002
- Genre: Christmas, pop, schlager
- Length: 55 minutes
- Label: Sony Music Entertainment

Peter Jöback chronology
| I Feel Good and I'm Worth It (2002) | Jag kommer hem igen till jul (2002) | Det här är platsen (2004) |

Jag kommer hem igen till jul is a Christmas album by Peter Jöback, released on 18 November 2002, consisting of both classic and modern Christmas songs. On the album charts, it topped in Sweden by late 2002. In late 2003, it reentered the charts including a new single, "Gå inte förbi", a duet with Norwegian singer Sissel Kyrkjebø. The album also peaked number four on the Norwegian Albums Chart.

The album sold more than 600 000 copies. The album was rereleased for the 10th anniversary in 2012.

== Recording ==
The album was recorded in August 2002 on Rommarö, during late summer heat. Outside, temperatures hit + 30 °C. Inside the studio, candles were lit to create Christmas spirit. Between recordings, Peter Jöback and the musicians went outside to bath in the water.

== Track listing ==
1. Intro, Här är vi med julens kransar (Deck the Hall with Boughs of Holly)
2. Viskar en bön
3. Ave Maria
4. Jag kommer hem igen till jul
5. Jul, jul, strålande jul
6. Gläns över sjö och strand
7. Snön föll
8. Decembernatt (Halleluja)
9. Guds frid i gode vise män (God Rest Ye Merry, Gentlemen)
10. Marias sång
11. O helga natt (Cantique de noël)
12. Jag tror på dig
13. Stilla natt (Stille Nacht, heilige Nacht)
14. Varmt igen

== Contributors ==
- Peter Jöback - vocals
- Lars Halapi - guitar, vibraphone, glockenspiel, omnichord
- Peter Korhonen - drums
- Robert Qwarforth - piano
- Thomas Axelsson - bass

== Charts ==
| Chart (2002–2005, 2012–2014) | Peak position |
|---|---|
| Norwegian Albums (VG-lista) | 4 |
| Swedish Albums (Sverigetopplistan) | 1 |
