= A Camp (album) =

Studio album by A Camp
- Released: 20 August 2001
- Recorded: 1998 & 2000
- Genre: Alternative pop, country pop
- Length: 55:20
- Label: Universal/Polydor; Stockholm
- Producer: Mark Linkous

A Camp chronology
A Camp (2001)	Colonia (2009)

Singles from A Camp
- 1. "I Can Buy You" Released: 27 June 2001; 2. "Song for the Leftovers" Released: 12 November 2001

A Camp is the debut album by A Camp, the side project of Nina Persson, vocalist for the popular Swedish indie/pop band The Cardigans. It was released on 20 August 2001. The album garnered critical acclaim from music critics. It produced two singles, "I Can Buy You" (UK No. 46) and "Song for the Leftovers". The album reached No. 87 on the UK Albums Chart.

== Critical reception ==
Professional ratings
Review scores
Source	Rating
AllMusic	4/5 stars
The Guardian	4/5 stars
Yahoo!	8/10 stars

AllMusic's Tim DiGravina praised the album as "a charming return to basic songcraft and a collaboration that will hopefully bear more fruit in the future" in comparison with Nina Persson's previous work with the Cardigans. The Guardian's Dave Simpson enthused that "this may well be Persson's best album", and called it "a major work, whatever it sells". Yahoo's Josh Rogan had special praise for producer Mark Linkous, concluding that "Linkous has crafted an album that complements Persson's songs and vision to great effect".

"I Can Buy You" was Record of the Week on Radio 1's Mark and Lard show.

== Track listing ==
All songs by Nina Persson and Niclas Frisk, unless otherwise stated.

No.	Title	Length
1.	"Frequent Flyer" (Nina Persson, Nathan Larson)	3:22
2.	"I Can Buy You"	3:49
3.	"Angel of Sadness"	4:22
4.	"Such a Bad Comedown"	3:59
5.	"Song for the Leftovers"	3:38
6.	"Walking the Cow" (Daniel Johnston)	3:04
7.	"Hard as a Stone"	2:28
8.	"Algebra" (Nina Persson)	3:33
9.	"Silent Night"	4:42
10.	"The Same Old Song"	5:33
11.	"The Oddness of the Lord"	3:28
12.	"Rock 'n' Roll Ghost" (Paul Westerberg)	3:59
13.	"The Bluest Eyes in Texas" (Van Stephenson, Dave Robbins, Tim DuBois)	5:04
14.	"Elephant" (Nina Persson, Mark Linkous)	4:19

"Rock 'n' Roll Ghost" produced by Niclas Frisk. "The Bluest Eyes in Texas" produced by Nathan Larson. All other songs produced by Mark Linkous

== Personnel ==
=== Musicians ===
- Nina Persson – Lead vocals, Jupiter 6, Mellotron, organ & bass pedals
- Nathan Larson – Guitars, Optigan, bass guitar, baritone guitar, piano, organ, synthesizers, and backing vocals
- Mark Linkous – Guitars, Optigan, tweaking, samples, tape manipulation, and backing vocals
- Niclas Frisk – Guitars, piano, harmonica, Mellotron, and backing vocals
- Clayton Doley – Piano, Hammond B3 and Vox organs, Mellotron, and Wurlitzer
- Scott Minor – Sample programming and signal processing
- Karl Berger – String arrangements and conducting
- Andrew Innes – Alto and tenor saxophones
- Al Weatherhead – Bass and slide guitar, mixing
- Kevin March – Drums and percussion
- Niko Rohicke – Pedal steel guitar
- Joan Wasser – Viola and violin
- Jason Glasser – Cello
- Miguel Urbiztondo – Drums
- Anders Hernestam – Drums
- Jane Scarpantoni – Cello
- Charlie Malmberg = Piano
- David Knowles – Trumpet
- Anders Paulson – Bass
- Paul Watson – Cornet
- Jess Hoffa – Saw

=== Production ===
- Mixed by Al Weatherhead
- Mastered by Bjorn Engelmann
- Artwork and design by Åbäke

== Charts ==
=== Weekly charts ===
Chart (2001)	Peak position
Austrian Albums (Ö3 Austria)	35
Danish Albums (Hitlisten)	40
Finnish Albums (Suomen virallinen lista)	21
German Albums (Offizielle Top 100)	91
Norwegian Albums (VG-lista)	11
Swedish Albums (Sverigetopplistan)	1
UK Albums (OCC)	87

=== Year-end charts ===
Chart (2001)	Position
Swedish Albums (Sverigetopplistan)	51
Chart (2002)	Position
Swedish Albums (Sverigetopplistan)	92
