= David Winter (actor) =

German actor

- Born: 23 February 1979 (age 47); Mons, Belgium
- Occupation: Actor
- Years active: 1994–present

David Winter (born 23 February 1979) is a German actor. He appeared in more than forty films since 1994.

== Selected filmography ==
Year	Title	Role	Notes
2001	Engel & Joe		
2002	Big Girls Don't Cry	Carlos	
2004-2005	18 – Allein unter Mädchen		TV
