= Higher (Peter Jöback song) =

2000 song by Peter Jöback

Single by Peter Jöback

from the album Only When I Breathe
- A-side: "Higher"
- B-side: "Searching for Love"
- Released: 2000
- Genre: pop
- Label: Sony
- Songwriter(s): Jörgen Elofsson, Mathias Venge

Peter Jöback singles chronology
"Hon ser inte mig" (1999)	"Higher" (2000)	"Tonight" (2000)

"Higher" is a song written by Jörgen Elofsson and Mathias Venge, recorded by Peter Jöback on his 2000 album Only When I Breathe. It was released as a single the same year.

== Charts ==
Chart (2000)	Peak positions
Sweden	2
