= Nike Sellmar =

Swedish singer

- Born: Nike Maria Mathilde Sellmar; 14 July 1995 (age 30); Stockholm
- Genres: Soul, rock
- Occupation: Singer

Nike Maria Mathilde Sellmar (born 14 July 1995) is a Swedish singer. She won Idol 2022 on 25 November 2022 in Tele2 Arena. Her winner song was "Anything You Say".

== Discography ==
=== Singles ===
List of singles, with selected chart positions
Title	Year	Peak chart positions	Album
Title	Year	SWE Heat.	Album
"With a Little Help from My Friends"	2022	—	Non-album singles
"Anything You Say"	2022	8	Non-album singles
