= Det här är platsen =

Studio album by Peter Jöback
- Released: 28 April 2004
- Genre: musical, pop
- Length: 49 minutes
- Label: Sony
- Producer: Lars Halapi

Peter Jöback chronology
Jag kommer hem igen till jul (2002)	Det här är platsen (2004)	Storybook (2004)

Det här är platsen is the fifth studio album by Swedish singer Peter Jöback. It was released in 2004.

== Track listing ==
1. Är det här platsen
2. Du har förlorat mer än jag
3. Sommarens sista sång
4. Ingen skyldighet
5. Mellan en far och en son
6. Bland nattens skuggor
7. Jag bär dig
8. Du behöver ingen hjälp
9. Glömskans tåg
10. Gör det nu
11. I allt jag ser

== Contributors ==
- Peter Jöback - vocals
- Lars Halapi – guitar, pedal steel, vibraphone, producer
- Peter Korhonen - drums
- Thomas Axelsson - bass
- Robert Qwarforth - piano, organ, synth

== Charts ==
=== Weekly charts ===
Chart (2004)	Peak position
Swedish Albums (Sverigetopplistan)	1

=== Year-end charts ===
Chart (2004)	Position
Swedish Albums (Sverigetopplistan)	32
