= Personliga val =

Studio album by Peter Jöback
- Released: 24 November 1997
- Genre: musical, pop
- Label: Sony

Peter Jöback chronology
| Peter Jöback (1993) | Personliga val (1997) | Only When I Breathe (2000) |

Personliga val is the second studio album by Peter Jöback, released in 1997 on CD and cassette tape.

== Track listing ==
1. "Nu eller aldrig" (This Is the Moment)
2. "Led hans väg" (Bring Him Home)
3. "Varför Gud?" (Why God, Why?)
4. "En sång om oss"
5. "Spindelkvinnans kyss"
6. "Det måste finnas bättre liv än det" (There's Gonna Be Something Better Than This)
7. "Ut mot ett hav"
8. "Jag vill inte ha nåt regn på min parad" (Don't Rain On My Parade)
9. "Nå't fint som pågår" (Good Thing Going)
10. "Vem ser ett barn?" (Pity the Child)
11. "Ett hörn av himlen" (A Piece of Sky / Papa, Can You Hear Me?)

== Personnel ==
- Magnus Persson, drums, percussion
- Esbjörn Svensson - piano, keyboards, cello, synth-bass
- Dan Berglund - bass
- Henrik Janson - guitar

== Charts ==
| Chart (1997–1998) | Peak positions |
|---|---|
| Swedish Albums (Sverigetopplistan) | 2 |
