= American Mystic =

- Film poster
- Directed by: Alex Mar
- Produced by: Jack Turner; Cathy Unruh; Nicholas Shumaker; Alex Mar
- Cinematography: Gregory Mitnick
- Edited by: Andy Grieve
- Music by: Nathan Larson
- Production company: Empire 8 Productions
- Distributed by: Kino Lorber
- Release date: April 22, 2010 (Tribeca)
- Running time: 80 minutes
- Country: United States
- Language: English

American Mystic is a 2010 American documentary film by writer-director Alex Mar. It premiered in the documentary competition at the 2010 Tribeca Film Festival.

== Synopsis ==
The documentary follows three young people, each a member of a fringe religious community, who have chosen to make their spiritual practice the center of their lives.

== Subjects ==
The film focuses on:

Morpheus
A Pagan priest, or "witch." Morpheus has moved to rural California to create a sanctuary for Pagans in the Bay Area.
Kublai
A Spiritualist medium, works on a farm in Upstate New York. He is learning to communicate with spirits through a local Spiritualist community.
Chuck
A Lakota Sioux, lives in South Dakota, works in Rapid City, and is raising a child with his wife in their traditional way of life. They take long trips to the Pine Ridge Reservation to participate in their tribe's traditions.

== Production ==
The documentary's production took about two and a half years, completing in early 2010. It was filmed in Upstate New York, northern California, and South Dakota. The movie was edited by Andy Grieve (a collaborator of Errol Morris and Alex Gibney) and scored by composer Nathan Larson (formerly of the band Shudder to Think).

== Release ==
American Mystic premiered in the documentary competition at the 2010 Tribeca Film Festival. It was then shown at the 2010 Albuquerque Film Festival, 2010 American Film Festival in Poland, the San Francisco DocFest 2010, PantheaCon 2011, and at the Clinton Street Theater in Portland, Oregon. It is currently streaming on Netflix.

The documentary also inspired the book Witches of America, by writer-director Alex Mar, published by Farrar, Straus & Giroux in October 2015.
