= Peter Jöback (album) =

Studio album by Peter Jöback
- Released: 1993
- Genre: soul pop
- Length: circa 43 minutes
- Label: Big Bag
- Producer: Lasse Holm

Peter Jöback chronology
Peter Jöback (1993)	Personliga val (1997)

Peter Jöback is the debut studio album by Peter Jöback, released in 1993. Together with his brother Mikael, he wrote the lyrics and music for the songs, and the album was produced by Lasse Holm. It is a soul pop album.

The album was given a "skull and crossbones" warning in a Nöjesguiden review, which in other words meant it was considered bad. In his 2006 song "Jag står för allt jag gjort", the words Min första skiva sågades referred to this.

== Track listing ==
1. "Varje gång vi ses"
2. "Nu när jag funnit dig"
3. "Du är min längtan"
4. "Behöver dig"
5. "Vem vet"
6. "Om du vill ha mer"
7. "Kom till mig"
8. "Vem bryr sig om"
9. "I din blick"
10. "Det ingen annan vet"

== Personnel ==
- Mikael Jöback - keyboard
- Mattias Torell - guitar
- Per Lindvall - drums
- Figge Boström - bass
- David Wilczewski - saxophone
