= Storybook (Peter Jöback album) =

Studio album by Peter Jöback
- Released: 2004
- Recorded: Gothenburg Concert Hall, Gothenburg, Sweden, 2004
- Genre: musical, pop
- Length: circa 48 minutes
- Label: Sony

Peter Jöback chronology
Det här är platsen (2004)	Storybook (2004)	Flera sidor av samma man (2006)

For Kasey Chambers 2011 album of the same name, see Storybook.

Storybook is a 2004 album by Peter Jöback, recorded by the Gothenburg Symphony Orchestra.

== Track listing ==
1. Nature Boy
2. Storybook
3. She (Tous les visages de l'amour)
4. The Windmills of Your Mind
5. Losing My Mind
6. I Don't Care Much
7. I Who Have Nothing (Uno dei tanti)
8. Always on My Mind
9. Summer Wine
10. The Sound Of Your Name (Ton nom)
11. Theme from "Schindler's List"
12. Live
13. Somewhere

== Contributors ==
- Peter Jöback - vocals
- Martin Östergren - piano)
- André Ferrari, - drums
- Fredrik Jonsson - bass
- Nick Davies - conductor
- Gothenburg Symphony Orchestra - musicians

== Charts ==
=== Weekly charts ===
Chart (2004–2005)	Peak position
Norwegian Albums (VG-lista)	3
Swedish Albums (Sverigetopplistan)	1

=== Year-end charts ===
Chart (2004)	Position
Swedish Albums (Sverigetopplistan)	46
