= Hot One =

Rock band

Hot One is an American rock band formed in 2005. Its members are guitarist/vocalist Nathan Larson, bassist/vocalist Emm Gryner, drummer Kevin March, and guitarist Jordan Kern. The band is characterized by a glam rock/post-punk sound and overtly political lyrical content. Hot One's self-titled debut album was released on October 10, 2006.

Former and current bands associated with Hot One include Shudder to Think, Guided by Voices, and The Dambuilders.

== History ==
Having grown up in the Dischord Records-dominated punk scene of Washington, D.C., Larson spent the 1990s as the lead guitarist for Shudder To Think. He split with the band in 1999 and went on to write scores for such films as Boys Don't Cry, Dirty Pretty Things, Tigerland, Palindromes, The Woodsman, and Little Fish among others.

Tiring of scoring, Larson returned to playing guitar and recruited Emm Gryner, an independent Canadian singer-songwriter with several self-released records and a stint backing up David Bowie among her many credits, as bass player. Gryner brought with her guitarist Jordan Kern of the Toronto-based band ESCALATE.

Next to sign on was Larson's ex-bandmate (in both Shudder To Think and the short-lived indie group Mind Science Of the Mind), Kevin March, who can also be credited as an ex-member of The Dambuilders and Those Bastard Souls. March had served as the drummer for Guided by Voices over the last years of the band's life, and was looking for his next move.

Between October and late December 2005, the band wrote the material which would comprise their debut album. Recordings were made in Williamsburg, Brooklyn, in the early days of 2006. The album was tracked and mixed entirely by the band themselves.

== Albums ==
- Hot One – October 10, 2006 – Modern Imperial Records through United For Opportunity
