= I Feel Good and I'm Worth It =

Studio album by Peter Jöback
- Released: 2002
- Genre: musical, pop
- Length: circa 54 minutes
- Label: Sony

Peter Jöback chronology
Only When I Breathe (2000)	I Feel Good and I'm Worth It (2002)	Jag kommer hem igen till jul (2002)

I Feel Good and I'm Worth It is the fourth studio album by Peter Jöback, released in 2002.

== Track listing ==
1. "She's Like a Butterfly" - 4:04
2. "Sinner" - 4:18
3. "Help Somebody" - 4:48
4. "Freeway" - 4:18
5. "My Fatal Love" - 4:21
6. "Crying on the Dancefloor" - 3:54
7. "This is the Year" - 4:09
8. "Heal" - 4:41
9. "Northern Guy" - 3:37
10. "Time to Get Tacky" - 4:03
11. "Undress Me" - 4:36
12. "I'm Gonna Do It" - 4:10
13. "I Feel Good (and I'm Worth It)" - 3:12

== Personnel ==
- Stefan Olsson - bass, guitar
- Rickard Nettermalm – drums
- Jörgen Ingeström - piano, keyboard

== Charts ==
Chart (2002)	Peak positions
Swedish Albums (Sverigetopplistan)	2
