= Stockholm i natt =

Single by Peter Jöback
- Released: 2007
- Genre: pop, schlager
- Label: Cupol
- Songwriters: Andreas Mattsson, Niclas Frisk, Peter Jöback

Peter Jöback singles chronology
""Italy vs Helsinki" (with Laakso)" (2007)	"Stockholm i natt" (2007)	""Han är med mig nu" (with Annika Norlin)" (2007)

"Stockholm i natt" is a song written by Andreas Mattsson, Niclas Frisk and Peter Jöback, and performed by Peter Jöback on his 2007 studio album Människor som du och jag. The single was released the same year and peaked at number four on the Swedish Singles Chart. Lyrically, the song deals with crimes throughout the history of Stockholm.

The song stayed at Svensktoppen for 22 weeks between 26 August 2007-20 January 2008, peaking at second position.

== Charts ==
Chart (2007)	Peak position
Sweden (Sverigetopplistan)	4
