= The Dewey Decimal System (novel) =

2011 novel by Nathan Larson

First edition

The Dewey Decimal System is a 2011 science fiction/noir novel by Nathan Larson. It was first published by Akashic Books.

== Synopsis ==
In a post-apocalyptic New York City, an amnesiac veteran – nicknamed "Dewey Decimal" for his self-imposed task of reorganizing the books in the remains of the New York Public Library – is an enforcer for the city's district attorney.

== Reception ==
PopMatters lauded Larson's characterization, and stated that Decimal's many flaws – in addition to amnesia, he also has obsessive-compulsive disorder – make him an archetypical private eye.

The A.V. Club praised the novel's premise and setting, with "patches of roughhewn poetry", but overall found it to be "frustrating" and "stilted (and) self-conscious", stating that Larson had insufficient "storytelling skill to match (the novel's) voice and vision".

Publishers Weekly felt that the relationships between characters "fail(ed) to engage", and that the "violence too often substitute(d) for plot coherence".

== Origins ==
Larson has said that the book's genesis was the image of a "beautifully dressed black man, asleep on the floor of the Rose Reading Room in the New York Public Library main branch", and that the character of Dewey Decimal is based partly on his cousins and grandfather (who were all veterans), and partly on a homeless man of Larson's acquaintance named "Chicago" (who "slept rough but dressed like a mod squad Desmond Dekker type").
