= Peter Jöback =

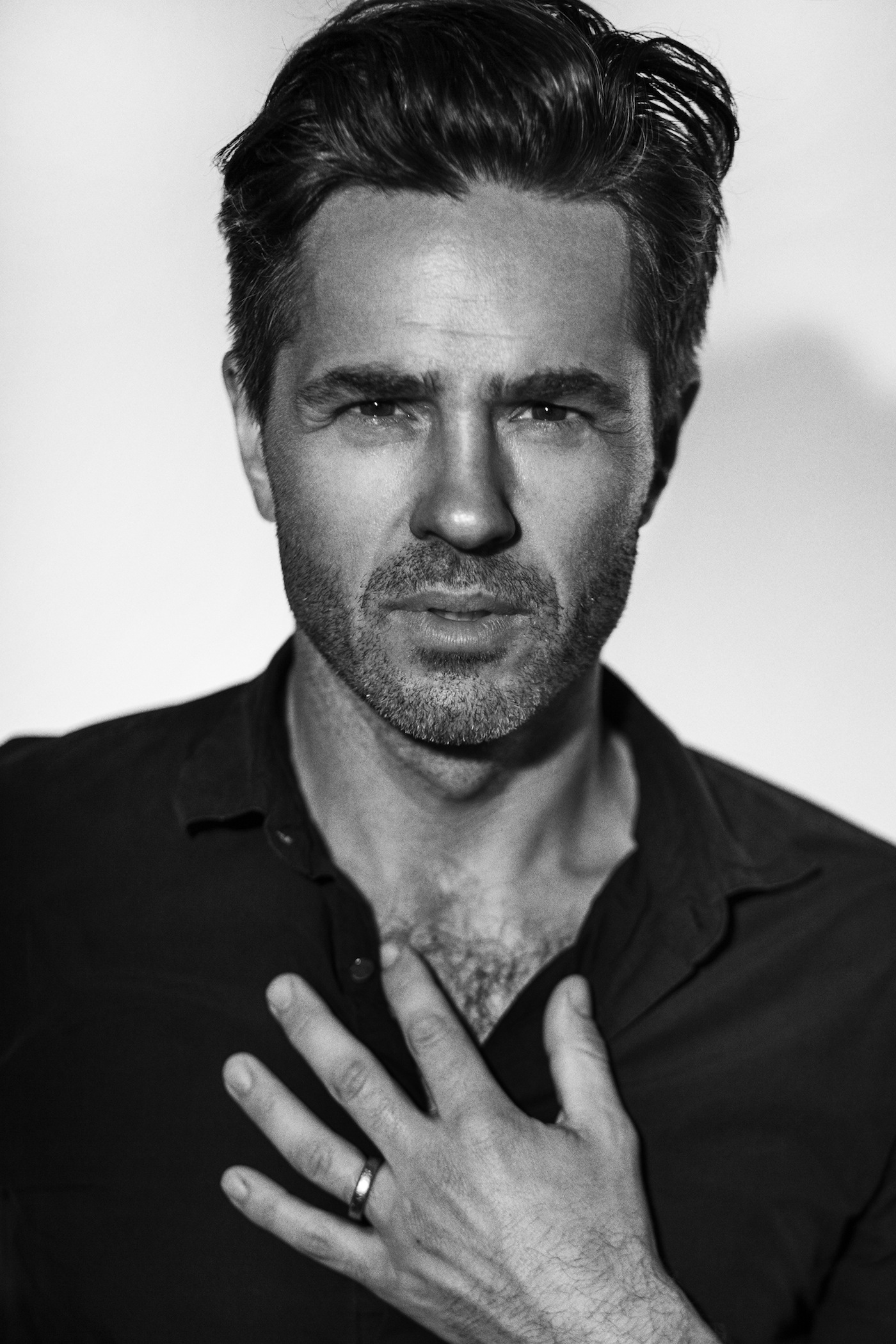
- Jöback in 2016

Background information
- Born: Peter Arne Jöback; 4 June 1971 (age 55); Stockholm, Sweden
- Origin: Stockholm
- Genres: Pop; Musical theatre
- Occupations: Singer, musical artist, actor, songwriter, pianist, guitarist
- Instruments: Voice; piano; guitar
- Years active: 1982–present
- Labels: Roxy; management: Dimberg Management
- Spouse: Oscar Jöback (m. 2010)
- Website: Official website

Peter Arne Jöback (born 4 June 1971) is a Swedish singer, actor and musical artist.

Jöback has acted in musical theatre, with lead roles in West End productions of Miss Saigon and The Witches of Eastwick. He is also known for his portrayals of the Phantom in West End and Broadway productions of The Phantom of the Opera. More recently, Jöback took on the role of Jean Valjean in a West End production of Les Misérables and reprised the role for Les Misérables: The Arena Spectacular World Tour.

== Biography ==
=== Early life and education ===
Peter Jöback was born on 4 June 1971 in Stockholm. He spent his childhood in Värmland and Östergötland.

As a student Jöback attended the Adolf Fredrik's Music School in Stockholm.

=== 1995–2000 ===
Peter Jöback got his professional break through his collaboration with ABBA's Björn Ulvaeus and Benny Andersson in their musical Kristina från Duvemåla (The Emigrants) at Malmö Opera and Music Theatre. Jöback created the role of Robert, whose theme song ("Guldet blev till sand") broke every record on the Swedish pop charts. The musical was seen by over one million Swedes, and the original cast's CD box became a triple-platinum album and received several Swedish Grammy awards. Jöback received his first Golden Mask for his role as Robert.

In 1997, Jöback released his album Personliga Val, which reached no. 2 on the Swedish album chart. It featured 11 pop-oriented interpretations of songs from famous musicals.

Cameron Mackintosh discovered Jöback's talent and offered him the lead as Chris in Miss Saigon at the Theatre Royal in London's West End in 1997. In 2000, at the same theatre, Jöback created the role of Michael in Macintosh's original production of The Witches of Eastwick.

=== 2000–2005 ===
In September of 2000, Peter Jöback released Only When I Breathe, his first studio album in English. The album reached no. 1 on the Swedish album charts.

Many of Jöback's stage performances and albums have been met with critical acclaim. On his Christmas album, released in 2002, Jöback teamed up with Norwegian singer Sissel Kyrkjebø in a duet of the Irish folk song "Be Thou My Vision" in a Swedish translation titled "Gå Inte Förbi". The duo have since become frequent guests at each other's concerts.

In 2004, Jöback collaborated with the Gothenburg Symphony Orchestra conducted by Nick Davies in a project called Storybook. For the project, he performed classic songs in new arrangements. The orchestra and Jöback later released a CD that became a Gold Disc. They also performed two concerts in the Globe Arena and Scandinavium Arena in Sweden. The album made Jöback a star in Norway, where his first solo tour in 2005 was a success with his audience and the media.

=== 2006–2010 ===
From 2006 to 2007, Jöback starred as the Emcee in a production of Cabaret in Stockholm and Gothenburg. He received critical praise as well as his second Golden Mask Tony Award. He had performed as the Emcee before in 2003 at the Gladsaxe Theatre in Copenhagen.

Jöback ended 2008 with a sold-out Christmas tour in arenas in Scandinavia following the release of a new 4× platinum-selling Christmas album. In 2007, he also toured Scandinavia with his platinum-selling studio album with original songs co-written by himself. In January 2009, Jöback moved to New York City to get new inspiration and make new acquaintances. This resulted in an album entitled East Side Stories, recorded in Woodstock, featuring prominent guests such as Kate Pierson from The B-52's, Sia, Gail Ann Dorsey and the group Betty.

Peter Jöback entered Melodifestivalen 2010, the Swedish pre-selection for the Eurovision Song Contest 2010. He received a wildcard from SVT. His song, "Hollow", reached the final of the competition, ultimately finishing in 9th.

=== 2011–present: Success in musical theatre ===
In 2011, Jöback performed in the finale of The Phantom of the Opera at the Royal Albert Hall. In 2012, Jöback starred as The Phantom in the West End production of The Phantom of the Opera taking over the role from Earl Carpenter. He reprised the role in the Broadway production in April 2013, taking over the role from Hugh Panaro. His last performance as The Phantom on Broadway was on 24 August, 2013, when Panaro took over the role again. However, he has since returned to bring the Phantom to Sweden. The show premiered in September 2016 in Stockholm. In January 2018, Jöback took over the role of The Phantom from Laird Mackintosh on Broadway for the 30th Anniversary, alongside Ali Ewoldt and he left the production again on March 31.

From December 2013 to April 2014, he played the title role in Sweeney Todd: The Demon Barber of Fleet Street at Stockholms Stadsteater.

On 26 January 2024, it was announced he’d have a month-long run in the West End production of Les Misérables as Jean Valjean from February 13 to March 9. In January and February 2025, he reprised his role in Sweden as part of the Arena World Tour.

Jöback placed second in the final of the fifth season of Masked Singer Sverige, which was broadcast on TV4.

== Personal life ==
Peter Jöback is the son of singer Monica Lind.

On 25 June 2010, Jöback married his partner, Oskar Nilsson, at the Cirkus Theatre in Stockholm.

== Discography ==
=== Studio albums ===
List of studio albums, with selected chart positions
Title	Album details	Peak chart positions		
Title	Album details	SWE	FIN	NOR
Peter Jöback	Released: 1993; Label: Big Bag	—	—	—
Personliga val	Released: November 1997; Label: Columbia	2	—	—
Only When I Breathe	Released: September 2000; Label: Columbia	1	28	—
I Feel Good and I'm Worth It	Released: March 2002; Label: Columbia	2	—	—
Jag kommer hem igen till jul	Released: November 2002; Label: Columbia	1	—	4
Det här är platsen	Released: April 2004; Label: Columbia	1	—	—
Storybook (with Gothenburg Symphony Orchestra)	Released: November 2004; Label: Columbia	1	—	3
Människor som du och jag	Released: September 2007; Label: Roxy, UMG	2	—	12
Himlen Är Inget Tak (with Eva Dahlgren)	Released: 2008; Label: Capitol	—	—	—
En God Jul Och Ett Gott Nytt År	Released: November 2008; Label: Roxy, UMG	—	—	8
East Side Stories	Released: October 2009; Label: Roxy, UMG	5	—	37
Livet, kärleken och döden – La vie, l'amour, la mort	Released: October 2011; Label: Razzia	2	—	36
I ♥ Musicals (with Stockholms Sinfonietta)	Released: September 2013; Label: Columbia	2	—	—
Humanology	Released: October 2018; Label: Sinclair	6	—	—
Atlas	Released: 12 April 2024; Label: Sinclair	—	—	—

=== Cast Recordings ===
List of cast recording albums, with selected chart positions
Title	Album details	Peak chart positions
Title	Album details	SWE
Cabaret (with Sara Lindh)	Released: January 2007; Label: Roxy	7

=== Live albums ===
List of live albums, with selected chart positions
Title	Album details	Peak chart positions
Title	Album details	SWE
En Kväll med Peter Jöback	Released: November 2010; Label: Razzia; Recorded: September 2010	27

=== Compilation albums ===
List of compilation albums, with selected chart positions
Title	Album details	Peak chart positions	
Title	Album details	SWE	SWE
Flera sidor av samma man	Released: July 2006; Label: Columbia	1	5

=== Singles ===
- 1990: "En sensation"
- 1990: "Let's Kiss (Like Angels Do)"
- 1991: "This Time"
- 1992: "More Than a Game" (with Towe Jaarnek)
- 1993: "Det ingen annan vet"
- 1993: "Du är min längtan"
- 1993: "Nu när jag funnit dig"
- 1996: "Guldet blev till sand"
- 1997: "En sång om oss"
- 1998: "Vem ser ett barn"
- 1999: "Hon ser inte mig"
- 2000: "Higher"
- 2000: "Tonight"
- 2001: "Under My Skin"
- 2002: "She's Like A Butterfly"
- 2002: "Sinner"
- 2003: "Gå inte förbi", duet with Sissel Kyrkjebø
- 2004: "Du har förlorat mer än jag"
- 2004: "Sommarens sista sång"
- 2006: "Jag blundar i solens sken"
- 2007: "Stockholm i natt"
- 2007: "Han är med mig nu", featuring Annika Norlin [Säkert]
- 2007: "Italy vs Helsinki", together with the band Laakso
- 2007: "Jag står för allt jag gjort"
- 2008: "Himlen är inget tak", with Eva Dahlgren
- 2009: "Sing", with Kate Pierson
- 2010: "Hollow"
- 2011: "Jag kommer hem igen till jul"
- 2022: "The River"
- 2023: "Får Jag Det Här Som Tack?!" (This Is The Thanks I Get?! from Wish)

=== Musicals and other shows ===
- 1982–83: Mio Min Mio
- 1982–84: The Sound of Music
- 1983–84: Snövit (Snow white)
- 1984–85: Kavallerijungfrun
- 1988: Här & Nu
- 1990: Melodifestivalen
- 1990: West Side Story
- 1991–92: Grease
- 1993: Aladdin
- 1993–94: Fame
- 1994: Djungelboken
- 1994–95: Musical Express 1 & 2
- 1995–98: Kristina Från Duvemåla
- 1997: Miss Saigon, in London
- 1997: Peter Jöback – A Musical Voyage
- 1998: Jesus Christ Superstar
- 1998: Personliga Val – Live
- 1998: Peter Jöback Show
- 1999: Där Regnbågen Slutar
- 2000: Stuart Little
- 2000: The Witches of Eastwick, in London
- 2003: Cabaret, in Copenhagen
- 2005: Concert tour in Norway
- 2005: Rhapsody in rock, Sweden tour
- 2006: Cabaret, in Stockholm
- 2007: Cabaret, in Gothenburg
- 2008: En julkonsert
- 2009: En julkonsert
- 2012-2013: The Phantom of the Opera, London and New York City
- 2022: I Wish My Life Were a Musical
- 2023: Wish
- 2024: Les Miserables, The Sondheim Theatre, London
- 2025: Les Miserables, Gothenburg, Malmo and Stockholm, Sweden
