= Popsicle (band) =

- Origin: Piteå, Sweden
- Genres: Indie
- Years active: 1991–1999; 2018–present

Popsicle is a Swedish pop group in Piteå, Sweden, which together with This Perfect Day, The Wannadies and Brainpool started the 1990s indiepop wave in Sweden.

== History ==
The band's four members, Andreas Mattsson (vocals, guitar), Fredrik Norberg (guitar, vocals), PA Wikander (drums) and Kenneth Wikstrom (bass), later replaced by Arvid Lind, formed the band in Stockholm in 1991 and released their first mini-album Template (1992) on Skellefteå label A West Side Fabrication. Later that year they issued Lacquer which reached number 34 in the national charts and included the song "Hey Princess". The album was well received by both critics and record buyers and won a Grammis Award. The group was given major publicity when the group's guitarist Fredrik Norberg said he wished that the members of dance band Arvingarna would die in a bus accident.

The songs were written by Norberg and Mattsson and was initially influenced by British guitar-based shoegazer band My Bloody Valentine and Ride. Popsicle may have laid the foundations of the Swedish indie scene, but it was not until four years later as the band played through to a wider audience, that they had their biggest hit – the single "Not Forever" from the self-titled third album.

Popsicle broke up in April 1999 when Fredrik Norberg, after a Japanese tour, announced that he would quit the band. Six years later the band reunited after a request from the record store Pet Sounds who wanted them to play on the store's 25th anniversary. The band liked the idea and also played an exclusive farewell gig at the Cirkus, Stockholm on 4 April 2005.

The band reformed in 2018 and have played a number of gigs in recent years. They most recently performed at the Stockholm Culture Festival where they played the Popsicle album in full.

== Discography ==
=== Albums ===
- Template (1992) (mini album)
- Lacquer (1992)
- Abstinence (1994)
- Popsicle (1996)
- Stand Up and Testify (1997)
- The Good Side Of Popsicle (2005) (2-CD, compilation)

=== Singles and EPs ===
- Whitsun (1992) (EP)
- Hey Princess (1993)
- The Power Ballads (1993) (EP)
- Make Up (1994)
- Histrionics (1995)
- Not Forever (1995)
- Please Do Not Ask (1996)
- Dusty Roads (1996)
- Dry Spot (1997)
- The Price We Pay (1997)
- The Sweetest Relief (1998)
- Summer (1998)
