= Andreas Mattsson =

Swedish singer

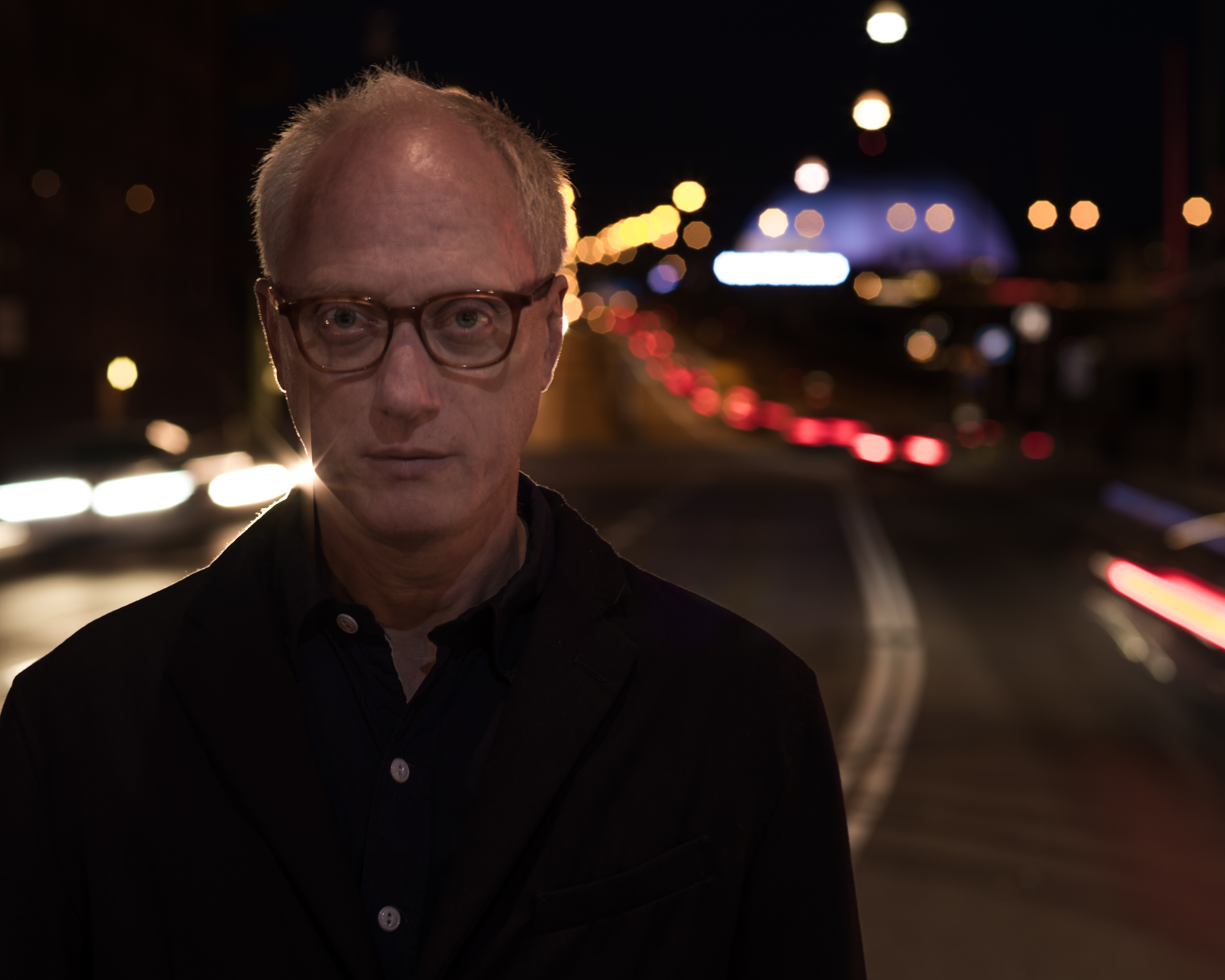
Andreas Mattsson

Per Andreas Mattsson (born 10 April 1967) is a Swedish singer and the lead singer of the band Popsicle. He has also had a solo career. In 2021, he was one of the singers part of the twelfth season of Så mycket bättre which was broadcast on TV4.

== Discography ==
=== Albums ===
Title	Year	Peak chart positions	Album
Title	Year	SWE	Album
"Kick Death's Ass"	2011	24	
