= Atomic Swing =

- Official logotype

Background information
- Years active: 1993–

Atomic Swing are a Swedish pop rock group formed in 1992. Their debut album, A Car Crash in the Blue, produced several hits in the Swedish charts. After an intense period the band split up, in 1997. The band reunited in 2006 and their latest album is called The Broken Habanas.

The Atomic Swing repertoire spans both dynamic and upbeat pop-rock hits and softer ballads, all characterized by Niclas Frisk's special vocal style and inventive guitar tracks.

== Members ==
- Niclas Frisk - vocals, guitar, songwriter
- Micke Lohse - keyboard and backing vocals
- Henrik Berglund - drums and percussion
- Petter Orwin (Dahlström) - Bass guitar and backing vocals
- Anders Graham-Paulsson - bass (1996-1997)

== Discography ==
=== Albums ===
- A Car Crash in the Blue (1993) AUS #96
- Bossanova Swap Meet (1994)
- Fluff (1997)
- In Their Finest Hour (Greatest Hits) (1998)
- The Broken Habanas (2006)
