= Nathan Larson (musician) =

American film music composer, musician, author

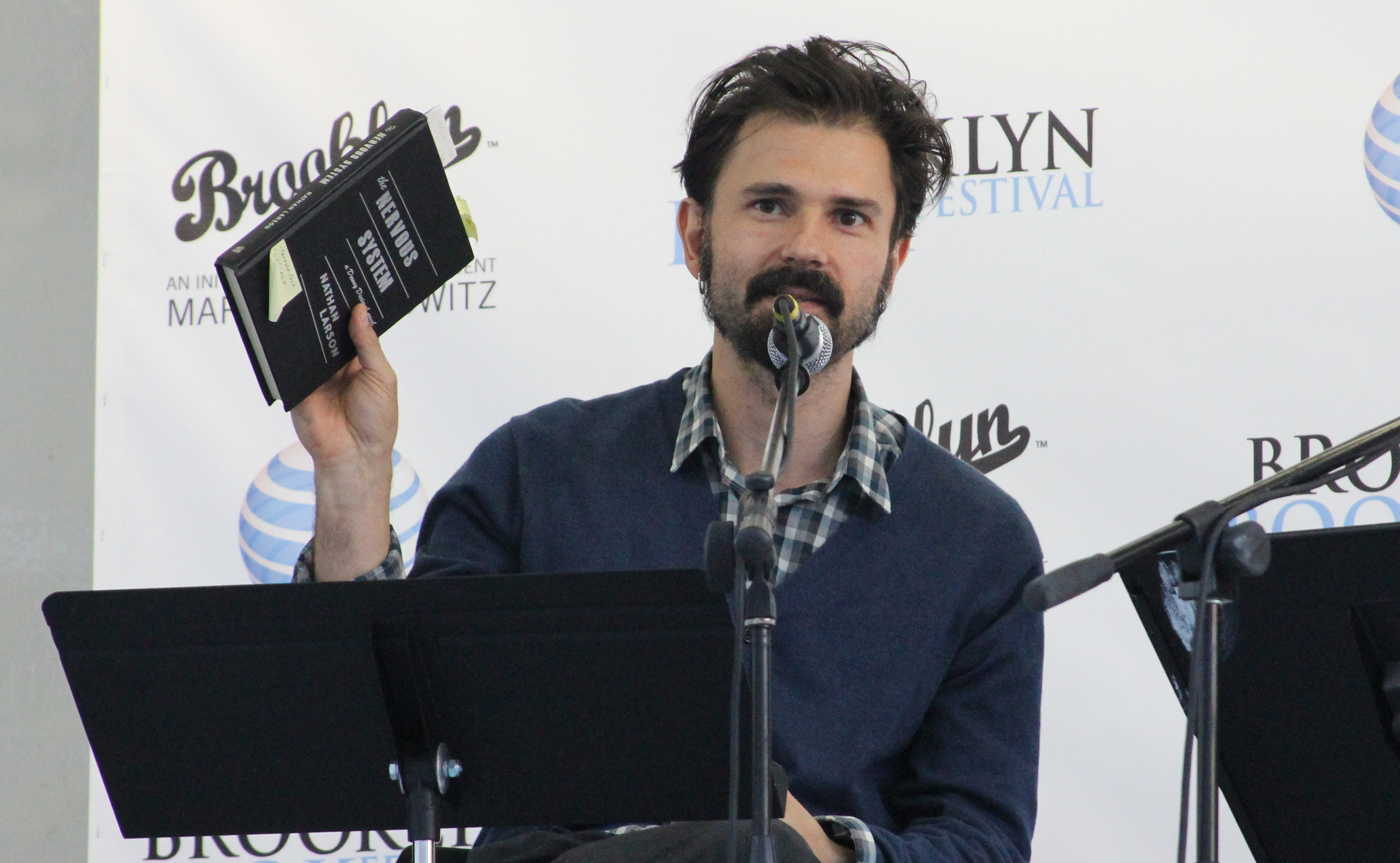
- Larson at the 2012 Brooklyn Book Festival

Background information
- Born: Nathan Peter Larson; Maryland, United States
- Genres: Experimental Music, Film score, Alternative Rock
- Occupations: Film score composer, singer, songwriter
- Instrument: Guitar

Nathan Peter Larson is an American guitarist, singer, songwriter, and author. He came to prominence in the 1990s as the guitarist for the rock group Shudder to Think. He has since worked on many film score compositions. He is married to Nina Persson, the lead singer of the Swedish rock band The Cardigans, and the couple has collaborated on several musical projects.

Larson is responsible for arranging 12-hour experimental music concert events, and is one of the founders of the LUMEN PROJECT.

In May 2011, Larson's debut novel, The Dewey Decimal System, was published by Akashic Books. The second book in the series was published summer 2012, and is entitled The Nervous System. The third and final installment in this series, The Immune System, was published in 2015.

== Music career ==
Maryland-born Larson was the lead guitarist for the 1990s band Shudder to Think, and the original bassist for the hardcore punk band Swiz. Larson was also the creative force behind the group Mind Science of the Mind, and founder of the band Hot One.

Larson and his wife Nina Persson have also been frequent musical collaborators, Persson providing vocals on several of Larson's film soundtracks, and Larson being a member of Persson's A Camp project and of the band on her solo album Animal Heart. Larson is also credited as co-writer of several songs on The Cardigans' 2005 album (and last to date), Super Extra Gravity.

He has produced albums for The Ark, Angela McCluskey's THE THINGS WE DO (Manhattan / Blue Note), among other work.

Larson is one of the co-founders of the Subchamber Ensmble, an experimental chamber music group.

In 2017, he was a co-founder of the international nonprofit LUMEN PROJECT, which creates 6-24 hour audio and visual experiences.

In addition to his work with "drone music" concerts, Larson is also a prolific film composer and has contributed to over 60 scores, as well as music for such series as HBO's VINYL and Show Me a Hero.

== Select discography ==
Solo

- Jealous God (Artemis Records, 2001)
- FilmMusik (Commotion Records, 2004)

With Shudder to Think

- Your Choice Live Series (Your Choice Records, 1992)
- Pony Express Record (Epic, 1994)
- 50,000 B.C. (Epic, 1997)
- High Art (Velvel Records, 1998)
- First Love, Last Rites (Epic/Sony Music Soundtrax, 1998)

With Mind Science of the Mind

- Mind Science of the Mind (Epic, 1996)

With A Camp

- A Camp (Stockholm Records, 2001)
- Colonia (Universal Records, 2009)

With Hot One

- Hot One (Modern Imperial Records, 2006)

Film scores

- 1998: Velvet Goldmine (contributed songs with Shudder To Think)
- 1999: Boys Don't Cry
- 2000: Tigerland
- 2002: Malcolm
- 2002: Lilja 4-ever
- 2002: Storytelling
- 2002: Le Chateau
- 2003: Mannen som log
- 2003: The Deal
- 2003: Dirty Pretty Things
- 2004: The Woodsman
- 2004: Prozac Nation
- 2004: A Love Song for Bobby Long
- 2005: Little Fish
- 2005: Palindromes
- 2008: Choke
- 2008: August
- 2008: Yes Madam, Sir
- 2009: Like Dandelion Dust
- 2009: The Messenger
- 2010: American Mystic
- 2010: Trust
- 2011: Margin Call
- 2011: Choose
- 2011: Our Idiot Brother
- 2011: Silent House
- 2013: Emanuel and the Truth About Fishes
- 2014: God's Pocket
- 2014: The Skeleton Twins
- 2017: Saturday Church
- 2018: Juliet, Naked
- 2020: High Fidelity (TV series)
- 2025: The Parenting

== Personal life ==
Larson is married to The Cardigans lead singer, Nina Persson. They wed in Malmö, Sweden. They have a son named Nils who was born on September 30, 2010. The couple formerly resided in New York City in the Manhattan neighborhood of Harlem, but currently reside in Malmö, Sweden. He was previously engaged to actress and musician Kerri Kenney-Silver.
