= Niclas Frisk =

Swedish musician (born 1969)

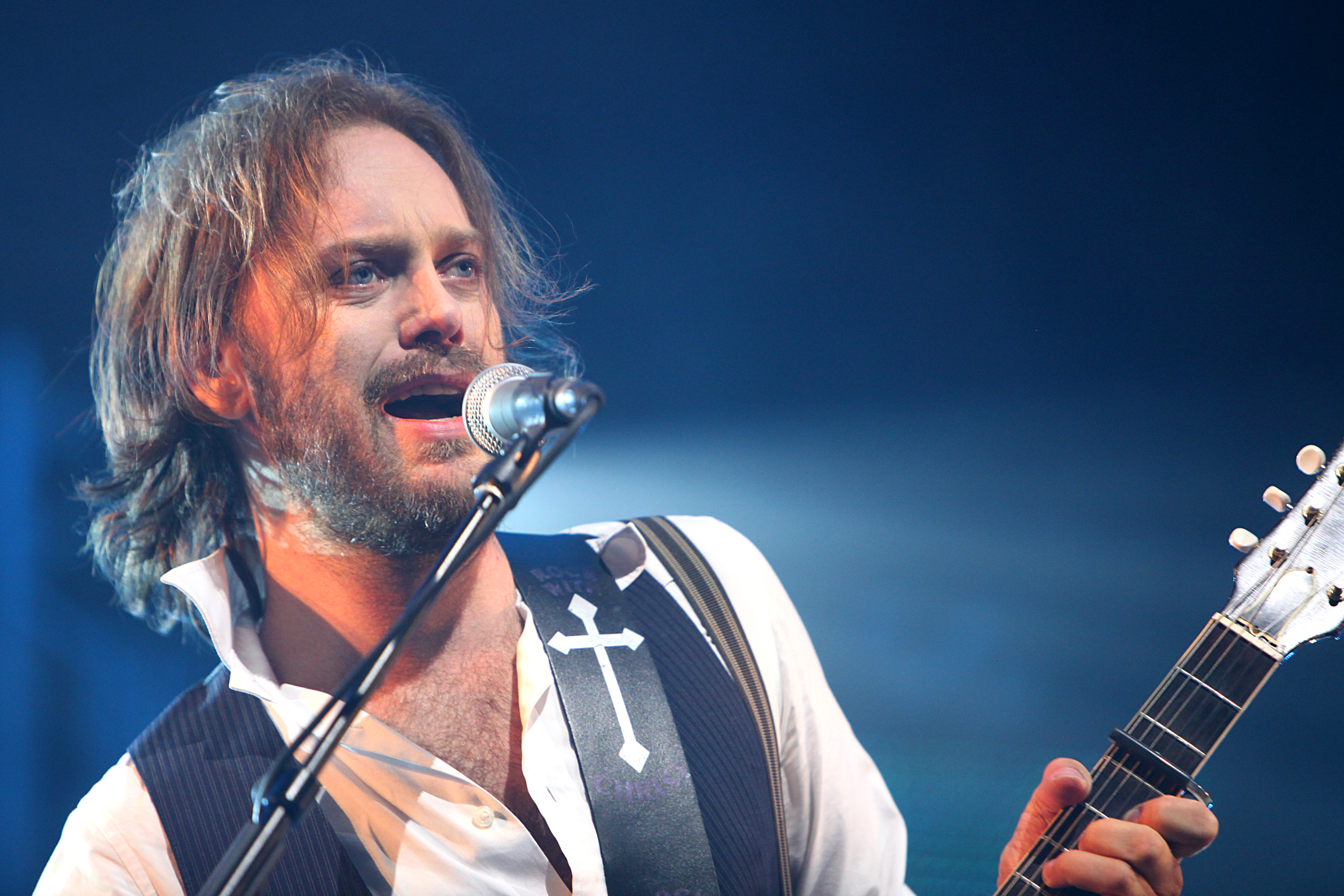
Niclas Frisk during a performance with the band A Camp at Stockholm Pride Festival, 2009

Niclas Patrik Frisk (born 1969) is a Swedish musician and the founder of Atomic Swing. He is a singer, guitarist, and composer. He started Atomic Swing after he was in Perssons Pack as the guitarist. He has worked as a producer, and wrote songs with Andreas Mattsson for Swedish artists Peter Jöback, Titiyo, Popsicle, Jerry Williams, Space Age Baby Jane, Brolle Jr, Carola, and Ainbusk He has written movie music for the films Expectations, Big Girls Don't Cry, and SÖK. Other bands he has been a member of include Sweet Chariots, A Camp, and Vanessa and the O's.

He was born in 1969 in Ludvika.
