= Conny Nimmersjö =

Swedish musician

- Birth name: Conny Nimmersjö
- Born: 1967 (age 57–58)
- Origin: Sweden
- Genres: Rock, indie pop, alternative rock
- Occupation(s): Musician, songwriter, producer
- Instrument(s): Guitar, vocals, keyboards

Conny Nimmersjö (born 1967) is a Swedish musician most known for playing guitar with bob hund and Bergman Rock.

== Biography ==
Nimmersjö was born in Ängelholm and raised in Södertälje. in 1991 Nimmersjö along with Thomas Öberg, Johnny Essing, Mats Hellquist, Jonas Jonasson and Mats Andersson formed bob hund in Stockholm. After a crowded show at the Hultsfred Festival in 1993 the band signed a record deal with Silence Records. Throughout the years bob hund has released several records and attracted a large following including Blur guitarist Graham Coxon. The band has also released two albums as their English alter ego Bergman Rock.

Apart from being a member in bob hund and Bergman Rock, Conny Nimmersjö is a regular guitarist with Joakim Thåström, Pelle Ossler and Pugh Rogefeldt both during live performances and recording sessions. In October 2007, Conny Nimmersjö released his debut album as a solo artist; Skörheten och oljudet. The record was praised in the media and Nimmersjö followed up with a Swedish tour, partly with a group of session musicians and partly on his own.

== Discography ==
With bob hund

- bob hund (1) (1993)
- bob hund (2) (1994)
- Jag rear ut min själ! Allt skall bort!!! (1998)
- bob hund sover aldrig (1999)
- Stenåldern kan börja (2001)
- 10 år bakåt & 100 år framåt (2002)
- Folkmusik för folk som inte kan bete sig som folk (2009)

With Bergman Rock

- Bergman Rock (2003)
- Bonjour Baberiba Pt II (2005)

With Thåström

- Skebokvarnsv. 209 (2005)
- Kärlek är för dom (2009)

As a solo artist

- Skörheten och oljudet (Dust Music), CD, 2007
- Tänk, nyss var här så trevligt (Novoton), CD and LP, 2015

Other appearances

- And The Lefthanded - And The Lefthanded (2002)
- Fredrik Saroea And The Fredrik Saroeas - Chamonix Et Paris (2003)
- And The Lefthanded - In The Kingdom Of Shadows (2004)
