= Carnival (The Cardigans song) =

1995 single by the Cardigans

- Swedish CD single cover

Single by the Cardigans

from the album Life
- B-side: "Mr Crowley"; "Emmerdale"
- Released: 25 March 1995
- Studio: Tambourine (Malmö, Sweden)
- Genre: Twee pop; lounge
- Length: 3:37 (album version); 3:20 (single/radio edit)
- Label: Trampolene; Stockholm
- Songwriters: Peter Svensson; Magnus Sveningsson; Nina Persson
- Producer: Tore Johansson

The Cardigans singles chronology
"Sick & Tired" (1995)	"Carnival" (1995)	"Sick & Tired" (reissue) (1995)

Music video
- "Carnival" on YouTube

"Carnival" is a song by the Swedish band the Cardigans. It was released on 25 March 1995 as the first single from their second album, Life (1995). Two years after its release, the track was featured in the film Austin Powers: International Man of Mystery, which helped the song gain further recognition.

== Background ==
The song concerns the narrator's unrequited love for a boy and references a carnival that she wishes to attend with him but does not, as he never responds.

"Carnival" was the first released material by the Cardigans on which Nina Persson received a writing credit, in this case alongside bassist Magnus Svenningsson, whom she would later supersede as the band's primary lyricist. An early version of the song was performed regularly during the band’s 1994 summer tour in support of their debut album, Emmerdale.

== Release ==
When released as a single, the B-side to "Carnival" included a cover of Ozzy Osbourne's "Mr. Crowley", one of several Osbourne covers recorded by the group, and "Emmerdale", an instrumental track that shares its name with their previous album but does not appear on it. The accompanying music video for the single, directed by Björn Lindgren, features the band performing the song at a 1960s-style dancehall.

The song marked the group's first appearance on the UK Singles Chart, reaching number 72 in the week of 17 June 1995. Following the success of their next single, a re-issue of "Sick & Tired", which reached the top 40, "Carnival" was repressed and peaked at number 35 in the week of 2 December 1995. The re-release also reached number 44 in the Netherlands, becoming the band's first single to chart there.

== Critical reception ==
The song was critically acclaimed. James Masterton of Dotmusic wrote, "It's in a similar vein to their last hit; light, almost fluffy jazz-pop that sounds gorgeous but is unlikely to bring them a major hit just yet." Holly Hernandez of Melody Maker described it as "frothy stimulation". John Mulvey of NME said the song "is blessed with a budget-flight-down-to-Rio bubbliness—imagine The Sugarcubes playing Swing Out Sister's greatest hits—that makes it oddly irresistible. Also, it shames me to report, the xylophone solo is pretty damned smart." Another NME editor, Mark Beaumont, described it as taking "a vibe-surfing bus tour around Parisian tourist spots". Mark Sutherland of Smash Hits gave "Carnival" a top score of five out of five and named it Best New Single, writing: "...they've just written the perfect pop song. Xylophones and guitars tinkle merrily, Nina coos Come on and love me now, every male on the planet goes Oh, alright then, and the whole world thinks Sod school/work for a game of soldiers and nips off to the coast for a bossa nova beach party. Last one in's a rotten egg!"

== Track listing ==
- International CD single (1995)
1. "Carnival" – 3:20
2. "Mr Crowley" – 2:35
3. "Emmerdale" – 2:25

== Charts ==
=== Weekly charts ===
Chart (1995–1996)	Peak position
Iceland (Íslenski Listinn Topp 40)	14
Netherlands (Dutch Top 40 Tipparade)	17
Netherlands (Single Top 100)	44
Scotland Singles (OCC)	41
UK Singles (OCC)	35

Chart (2025)	Peak position
Japan Hot Overseas (Billboard Japan)	20

=== Year-end charts ===
Chart (1995)	Position
Latvia (Latvijas Top 50)	82

== Certifications ==
Region	Certification	Certified units/sales
Japan (RIAJ)	Gold	100,000^{*}
^{*} Sales figures based on certification alone.

== Release history ==
Region	Date	Format(s)	Label(s)	Ref.
Japan	25 March 1995	CD	Trampolene; Polydor	
United Kingdom	15 May 1995	7-inch vinyl; CD; cassette	Trampolene; Stockholm	
