= Bob hund (1993 album) =

bob hund

Studio album by bob hund
- Released: 1 November 1993
- Recorded: 1993
- Studio: Tambourine Studios (Malmö, Sweden)
- Genre: Rock
- Length: 20:08
- Label: Silence Records; SRSCD 4720
- Producer: Eggstone and bob hund

Bob hund chronology
| bob hund (1993) | bob hund (1994) |

bob hund is the debut release by bob hund. Produced and mixed by Eggstone and bob hund. Sound improvements by Peter In De Betou, Cutting Room. Graphic design and concept by Martin Kann. Photo by Henrik Håkansson.

== Track listing ==
(English translation within parentheses)

1. "Allt på ett kort" – 2:31 (double meaning: "all-in" but also "all in one picture")
2. "Rundgång, gräslök, fågelsång" – 2:11 ("Feedback, chives, birdsong")
3. "Kompromissen" – 3:54 ("The compromise")
4. "5 meter upp i luften" – 4:51 ("5 meters up in the air")
5. "Fotoalbumet" – 3:26 ("The photo album")
6. "Den ensamme sjömannens födelsedag" – 3:11 ("The lonesome sailor's birthday")
