= Häpna =

Swedish record label

Häpna is a Swedish record label. It has released records by Toshiya Tsunoda, Time is a Mountain, Sagor & Swing, Eric Malmberg, Hans Appelqvist and Tape.
