= Bob hund (1994 album) =

bob hund

Studio album by bob hund
- Released: 12 August 1994
- Recorded: 1994
- Studio: Tambourine Studios (Malmö, Sweden)
- Genre: Indie rock
- Length: 43:39
- Label: Silence Records; SRS 4723 / SRSCD 4723
- Producer: bob hund, Eggstone and Zqatzy

Bob hund chronology
bob hund (1993)	bob hund (1994)	Omslag: Martin Kann (1996)

bob hund is the Swedish band bob hund's first full-length studio album and second self-titled release. The album peaked at number 11 on the Swedish Albums Chart.

== Track listing ==
(English translation within parentheses)

1. "Allseende ögat" – 1:40 ("The All-Seeing Eye")
2. "Mer än så kan ingen bli" – 4:21 ("More Than That, No One Can Be")
3. "100 år" – 2:25 ("100 Years")
4. "15 år bakåt och 15 år framåt" – 2:55 ("15 Years Back and 15 Years Forward")
5. "En rikedom av sandkorn" – 6:05 ("A Wealth of Sand Grains")
6. "Länge, länge" – 4:08 ("A Long, Long Time")
7. "Ett gipsat löfte" – 3:31 ("A Promise in Plaster")
8. "Det skulle vara lätt för mig att säga att jag inte hittar hem men det gör jag; tror jag" – 9:15 ("It Would Be Easy for Me to Say That I Can't Find My Way Home But I Can; I Think")
9. "Den nollgradige" – 3:20 ("The One Being Zero Degrees")
10. "Dur och moll om vartannat" – 5:59 ("Major and Minor Keys Alternating")

== Personnel ==
- Mats Andersson - Drums
- John Essing - Guitar
- Mats Hellquist - Bass
- Jonas Jonasson - Synth, backing vocals
- Conny Nimmersjö — Guitar
- Thomas Öberg - Lead vocals

== Charts ==
Chart (1994)	Peak position
Swedish Albums (Sverigetopplistan)	11
