= Chesty Morgan (band) =

Swedish musical group

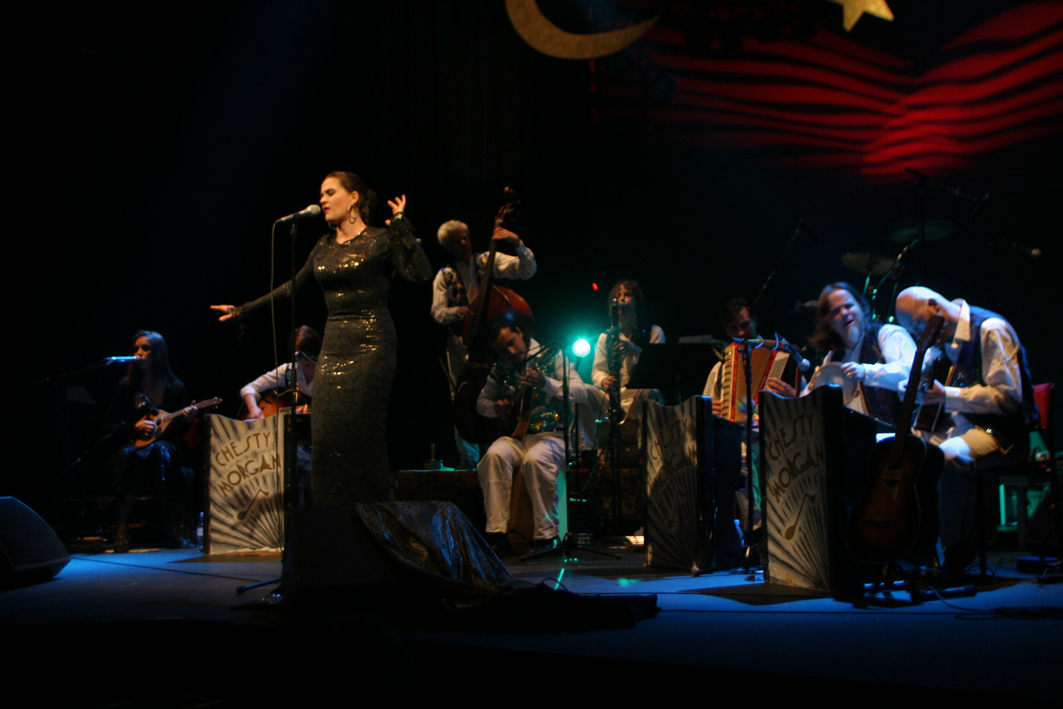
- The ensemble 2006 in Stockholm

Background information
- Origin: Sweden
- Genres: Cabaret

Chesty Morgan is a Swedish musical group named after the 1970s exploitation-film actress.

== Premise ==
A collective ensemble from Stockholm, the group generally provides an atmospheric euro-cabaret take on Gypsy tunes. The band features Maya de Vesque on vocals, Per Sunding and Patrik Bartosch from Eggstone, and Johnny Essing from bob hund.

One of the group's concepts, besides switching instruments and having comic interaction between the band and their primadonna Maya, is using as many different languages as possible in the same shows. In connection with an organized remembrance in Stockholm of Mae West on the 100th anniversary of the film diva's birth, Chesty Morgan added two of West's big numbers, They Call Me Sister Honky-Tonk and Love Is the Greatest Thing, to the English repertoire.
