= Sick & Tired (The Cardigans song) =

1994 single by the Cardigans

Single by the Cardigans

from the album Emmerdale
- B-side: "Plain Parade"; "Laika"; "Pooh Song"; "The Boys Are Back in Town"
- Released: September 1994
- Studio: Tambourine (Malmö, Sweden)
- Length: 3:24
- Label: Trampolene
- Songwriters: Peter Svensson; Magnus Sveningsson
- Producer: Tore Johansson

The Cardigans singles chronology
| "Rise and Shine" (1994) | "Sick & Tired" (1994) | "Carnival" (1995) |

Music video
- "Sick & Tired" on YouTube

"Sick & Tired" is a song by Swedish band the Cardigans, written by Peter Svensson and Magnus Sveningsson, and produced by Tore Johansson. It was released in September 1994 by Trampolene as the third single from their debut album, Emmerdale (1994), in Sweden and as their first single in Japan the following month. The song was subsequently included on the international release of their second album, Life (1995), and issued as its first single in March 1995. A reissue later the same year became the group's first top-40 hit in the United Kingdom. In February 1996, it reached number one in Iceland, staying at the summit for four weeks. A music video was produced to promote the single, directed by Swedish director Björn Lindgren.

== Composition ==
The song addresses the aftermath of a summer love affair that ended badly, leaving the narrator "sick and tired". In the chorus, the narrator addresses her former lover, suggesting that "you can always say you did no major harm", before immediately rejecting such a notion with "oh spare me if you please".

== Critical reception ==
Writing for Dotmusic, James Masterton wrote, "The single is a lovely laid-back oddity which deserves a far bigger chart audience than it is likely to get." Holly Hernandez from Melody Maker commented, "Take 'Sick & Tired', the one you're most likely to have heard (it still amazes me that such a perfectly delicate song can contain the word "sick" and still lose none of its charm); a slice of pure Gallic gorgeousness (The Cardigans are Swedish, but that's almost academic) — France Gall's 'Poupée de son' for the Nineties and for people who think this has't been done before." Another MM editor, Simon Price, wrote, "Where most merely rock, The Cardigans swing. Imagine a Saint Etienne who didn't acknowledge the Nineties. Or the Eighties. Or even the Seventies. Imagine Sex and the Single Girl, Christine Keeler, Barefoot in the Park, open-top MG midgets on the promenade at St Tropez, Et Dieu Crea La Femme... This is musical Nouvelle Vague. Adorable."

Pan-European magazine Music & Media commented, "Don't be fooled by the saccharine vocals. These hipsters may lean towards Burt Bacharach, but they are definitely tongue-in-cheek, as proved by their perky version of Thin Lizzy's 'The Boys Are Back in Town', also featured on this single." NME ranked 'Sick & Tired' number six in their list of the Top 20 of 1995, writing, "Aka The Best Pop Song Never Written By The Beatles, this is a bright'n'breezy, yet curiously melancholic offering from the (yes!) Swedish crew with a penchant for mod style and bossanova cover versions of heavy metal classics. Plus it features a fantastic bassoon solo. Honest." Mark Sutherland from Smash Hits gave it five out of five, saying, "But actually, this one is even better [than 'Carnival']: a lazy, hazy summer's-nearly-gone type song, with heavenly vocals from Nina, a brilliant video and even a nifty bassoon solo. No, really."

== B-sides ==
All of the B-sides from both issues of the single were later included on the compilation The Other Side of the Moon. All except the cover of "The Boys Are Back in Town" also appeared on the 2CD edition of Best Of The Cardigans.

== Track listings ==
- Sweden CD single (1994) and international CD single (1995)
1. "Sick & Tired"
2. "Plain Parade"
3. "Laika"
4. "Pooh Song"
- UK CD single (re-issue) (1995)
1. "Sick & Tired"
2. "Pooh Song"
3. "The Boys Are Back in Town"
4. "Carnival (Puck version)"

== Charts ==
=== Weekly charts ===
| Chart (1995–1996) | Peak position |
|---|---|
| Iceland (Íslenski Listinn Topp 40) | 1 |
| Scotland Singles (OCC) | 37 |
| UK Singles (OCC) | 34 |

=== Year-end charts ===
| Chart (1996) | Position |
|---|---|
| Iceland (Íslenski Listinn Topp 40) | 25 |
