= Life (The Cardigans album) =

Studio album by the Cardigans
- Released: 24 March 1995
- Recorded: 1994
- Studio: Tambourine Studios (Malmö, Sweden)
- Genre: Pop; pop rock; lounge; easy listening
- Length: 45:22 (original version); 47:04 (UK); 47:59 (US)
- Label: Stockholm
- Producer: Tore Johansson

The Cardigans chronology
Emmerdale (1994)	Life (1995)	First Band on the Moon (1996)

Singles from Life
- 1. "Carnival" Released: March 1995; 2. "Hey! Get Out of My Way" Released: 1995; 3. "Sick & Tired" Released: September 1995; 4. "Rise & Shine" Released: February 1996

Professional ratings
Initial reviews (in 1995/1996)
Review scores
Source	Rating
Alternative Press	2/5 stars
Chicago Tribune	3/4 stars
Entertainment Weekly	A
NME	8/10
Select	3/5 medals
Smash Hits	5/5 stars
Sunday News	8/10

Professional ratings
Retrospective reviews (after 1995/1996)
Review scores
Source	Rating
AllMusic	4/5 stars
Encyclopedia of Popular Music	3/5 stars
The Rolling Stone Album Guide	4/5 stars

Life is the second studio album by Swedish pop rock band the Cardigans. It was released worldwide in 1995 and was an international success, especially in Japan, where it achieved platinum status. Outside of Sweden and Japan (where debut Emmerdale had been released in 1994), it was released as their first album: a compilation of tracks from both Emmerdale and Life. It was released on 20 February 1996 in the United States under the label Minty Fresh Records.

== Track listing ==
All music composed by Peter Svensson, except "Sabbath Bloody Sabbath" by Tony Iommi, Geezer Butler, Bill Ward, Ozzy Osbourne

=== Swedish edition ===
1. "Carnival" (Lyrics: Nina Persson, Svensson, Sveningsson) – 3:37
2. "Gordon's Gardenparty" (Lyrics: Persson, Svensson) – 3:22
3. "Daddy's Car" (Lyrics: Sveningsson, Bengt Lagerberg) – 3:35
4. "Pikebubbles" (Lyrics: Sveningsson, Svensson) – 3:05
5. "Tomorrow" (Lyrics: Sveningsson) – 3:05
6. "Beautiful One" (Lyrics: Sveningsson) – 3:28
7. "Travelling with Charley" (Lyrics: Sveningsson, Svensson) – 4:09
8. "Fine" (Lyrics: Sveningsson) – 3:11
9. "Sunday Circus Song" (Lyrics: Sveningsson, Svensson) – 3:56
10. "Hey! Get Out of My Way" (Lyrics: Persson, Svensson) – 3:30
11. "Closing Time" (Lyrics: Lars-Olof Johansson, Sveningsson, Svensson) – 10:22

=== UK, French, Canadian and Brazilian version ===
1. "Carnival" – 3:37
2. "Gordon's Gardenparty" – 3:22
3. "Daddy's Car" – 3:35
4. "Sick & Tired" (Lyrics: Sveningsson) – 3:24
5. "Tomorrow" – 3:05
6. "Rise & Shine" (Lyrics: Sveningsson) – 3:30
7. "Beautiful One" – 3:28
8. "Travelling with Charley" – 4:09
9. "Fine" – 3:11
10. "Celia Inside" (Lyrics: Sveningsson) – 4:42
11. "Hey! Get Out of My Way" – 3:32
12. "After All..." (Lyrics: Sveningsson) – 2:57
13. "Sabbath Bloody Sabbath" (Lyrics: Butler) – 4:32

This version omits "Pikebubbles", "Sunday Circus Song" and "Closing Time", replacing them with "Sick & Tired", "Rise & Shine", "Celia Inside", "After All..." and "Sabbath Bloody Sabbath" from Emmerdale. "Celia Inside" is a longer edit, and "Rise & Shine" is a new recording, while the others are taken directly from the previous album. The omitted song "Pikebubbles" was released internationally as the B-side to the 1995 "Rise & Shine" single. Additionally, "Hey! Get Out Of My Way" is the single version.

=== US edition ===
1. "Carnival" – 3:36
2. "Daddy's Car" – 3:35
3. "Fine" – 3:09
4. "Rise & Shine" – 3:28
5. "Our Space" – 3:29
6. "Celia Inside" – 4:40
7. "Over the Water" – 2:13
8. "Tomorrow" – 3:03
9. "Sick & Tired" – 3:23
10. "Beautiful One" – 3:27
11. "Gordon's Gardenparty" – 3:19
12. "Hey! Get Out of My Way" – 3:30
13. "Sabbath Bloody Sabbath" – 4:30
14. "Happy Meal" – 2:36

This version omits "Pikebubbles", "Travelling with Charley", "Sunday Circus Song" and "Closing Time", replacing them with "Rise & Shine", "Our Space", "Celia Inside", "Over the Water", "Sick & Tired" and "Sabbath Bloody Sabbath" from Emmerdale and exclusive US bonus track "Happy Meal". The four omitted tracks were included as a bonus disc with the US version of Emmerdale, released in 1997.

== Personnel ==
- Lars-Olof Johansson – keyboards, piano, guitar, vocals
- Bengt Lagerberg – drums, percussion
- Nina Persson – lead vocals
- Magnus Sveningsson – bass, vocals
- Peter Svensson – guitar, vocals

== Other appearance ==
"Carnival" was featured on the soundtracks of the 1997 film Austin Powers: International Man of Mystery and the 1996 Australian film Love and Other Catastrophes, and it also appeared in an episode of the MTV animated series Daria.

== Singles ==
=== Continental Europe/UK ===
- "Sick & Tired" (March 1995, #96 UK)
- "Carnival" (May 1995, #72 UK)
- "Sick & Tired" (re-release, September 1995, #34 UK)
- "Carnival" (re-release, November 1995, #35 UK)
- "Rise & Shine" (February 1996, #29 UK)

=== Japan/Sweden ===
- "Carnival"
- "Hey! Get Out of My Way"
- "Rise & Shine" (Japan only re-release)

== Charts ==
Chart (1995–96)	Peak; position
German Albums (Offizielle Top 100)	50
Icelandic Albums (Plötur og Diskar)	1
Japanese Albums (Oricon)	13
Scottish Albums (Official Charts)	69
Swedish Albums (Sverigetopplistan)	20
UK Albums (Official Charts)	51

== Certifications ==
Region	Certification	Certified units/sales
Japan (RIAJ)	2× Platinum	500,000
Sweden (GLF)	Platinum	191,000
United Kingdom (BPI)	Gold	100,000^{*}
Summaries
Worldwide	—	1,500,000
^{*} Sales figures based on certification alone.
