= BrasilCine =

BrasilCine is the only Brazilian Film Festival taking place in Scandinavia. The festival’s main goal is to promote the diversity of the Brazilian culture through the lenses of the rich contemporary cinematographic industry in Brazil.

BrasilCine takes place every year at Zita. The festival aims to portray an image of the Brazilian society that differs from the common stereotypes by offering an array of movies addressing many different themes which are also produced in different regions of the country. BrasilCine - The festival

BrasilCine exhibits both fiction movies (feature length, media and short films), as well as documentaries, always embracing diverse genres and themes. The festival also organizes shows, seminars and lectures with guests from Brazil and Sweden.

== BrasilCine's history ==
BrasilCine was created in 2005 in the city of Gothenburg. The demand for Brazilian movies was intense and, in the following year, Stockholm also became part of the festival where it takes place at the movie theater Zita, and Swedish singer and songwriter Johan Christher Schütz was closely involved in the Stockholm start-up. Since 2006, BrasilCine is organized by the non-profitable association Föreningen för Svensk och Brasiliansk Kultur.

=== BrasilCine's editions ===
Edition	Year	City
1st	2005	Gothenburg
2nd	2006	Gothenburg & Stockholm
3rd	2007	Stockholm
4th	2009	Stockholm
5th	2010	Stockholm
6th	2011	Stockholm
7th	2012	Stockholm
8th	2013	
9th	2014	
10th	2015	
