= Music Inspired by Lord of the Rings =

Studio album by Bo Hansson
- Released: December 1970
- Recorded: Late 1969 – early 1970
- Studio: Bo Hansson's summer house on Älgö in the Stockholm archipelago and Studio Decibel in Stockholm
- Genre: Progressive rock; space rock
- Length: 38:13
- Label: Silence
- Producer: Anders Lind, Bo Hansson

Bo Hansson chronology
Music Inspired by Lord of the Rings (1970)	Magician's Hat (1972)

Alternative cover
- Cover of the original Sagan om ringen release

Alternative cover
- Cover of the 1977 reissue

Music Inspired by Lord of the Rings is an instrumental progressive rock album by Swedish musician Bo Hansson. As its title suggests, it is a concept album based on author J. R. R. Tolkien's high fantasy novel, The Lord of the Rings. The album was originally issued in Sweden in late 1970, under the Swedish title of Sagan om ringen, and was subsequently re-released internationally as Music Inspired by Lord of the Rings in September 1972.

The album reached the Top 40 of the UK Album Chart and was eventually certified gold in the UK and Australia. It was also moderately successful in America, where it reached number 154 on the Billboard Top LPs & Tape chart. Music Inspired by Lord of the Rings remains the only release by Hansson to have reached the UK and US charts and as a result, it is by far his best known and most successful album.

== Background and recording ==
Prior to the recording of Music Inspired by Lord of the Rings, Bo Hansson had worked as one half of the duo Hansson & Karlsson. The duo were relatively well known in their native Sweden; between 1967 and 1969 they released a series of well received albums. By early 1969, however, Hansson's musical partner Janne Karlsson had embarked upon a successful career as a television presenter and comedian, resulting in the breakup of the duo. At around the same time, Hansson became fascinated with the works of J. R. R. Tolkien and in particular The Lord of the Rings, after being introduced to the book by a girlfriend. Hansson moved into a friend's apartment and began working on a musical interpretation of the book, producing a number of demo recordings of material that would eventually be included on the album.

Hansson then approached sound engineer and founder of Silence Records, Anders Lind, with the idea of recording an album based on the book. Lind was encouraged by the demos and agreed to release the album on Silence. However, the fledgling record company could not afford the expensive recording studio time needed to realise the production of the album and so, a small summer house on the remote island of Älgö, in the Stockholm archipelago, was converted into a makeshift recording studio. Throughout late 1969, Hansson and Lind worked on the album at the summer house, with the help of a handful of session musicians and friends, before relocating to Studio Decibel in Stockholm to complete the album in early 1970. Hansson has stated that his original intention for the album was to include a string section and other exotic instruments, such as the harp, but the lack of finances available from Silence Records resulted in the majority of the album having to be recorded using primitive electronic keyboards and Moog synthesizers.

== Release and reception ==
Professional ratings
Review scores
Source	Rating
AllMusic	4.5/5 stars
Q	3/5 stars

The album was released in Sweden by Silence Records in December 1970, with the title Sagan om ringen (which was also the title of the Swedish translation of The Lord of the Rings at the time; lit. "The Saga of the Ring"). It enjoyed modest commercial success in its native country and received heavy rotation on the Swedish national radio station Sveriges Radio P3. Following its initial release, Hansson composed additional material based on Tolkien's book and consequently, later pressings of the album contained extra tracks not found on the original Swedish release.

News of the album's success and popularity in Sweden travelled to England and as a result, it was licensed to Tony Stratton Smith's Charisma Records in 1972. However, Hansson and Charisma were forced to give the album the augmented title of Music Inspired by Lord of the Rings, at the insistence of Tolkien and his publishers Allen & Unwin. Tolkien's publishers also had a hand in determining the musical content of the album, as Hansson told music journalist Tony Tyler in the 18 November 1972 edition of the NME: "I originally intended to use voices – perhaps a girl soprano – on the tracks but when we contacted George Allen and Unwin they put a firm 'no' to the idea. So we had to use the term 'inspired' by Lord of the Rings' – and we had to keep it purely instrumental." The original 1972 Charisma release of the album sported front and back cover illustrations by Jane Furst.

The album was issued by Charisma Records in September 1972, accompanied by an extensive television advertising campaign. In the UK alone there were thousands of advance orders for the album and upon release, it quickly became popular with fans of progressive rock. The album's blend of strange, other-worldly music and Tolkienesque subject matter proved popular during the early 1970s, a time when interest in Tolkien's writings among college students was at an all-time high. The album peaked at number 34 on the UK Album Chart in November 1972 and reached number 154 on the US Billboard Top LPs & Tape chart in May 1973, eventually becoming a gold record in the UK and Australia. Although no official singles were taken from the album, a promo-only single featuring the song "The Black Riders & Flight to the Ford" was issued by Charisma Records in 1974.

In retrospect, many critics consider the album to be a classic of the progressive rock genre as well as Hansson's best work. In addition, it can be seen as an early example of multi-instrumentalist rock, predating similar 1970s albums by artists such as Mike Oldfield, Rick Wakeman, and Brian Eno. In his book The Billboard Guide to Progressive Music, author Bradley Smith has described the album as "an early classic of space music" and Bruce Eder, writing for the Allmusic website, has called it "one of the few progressive rock instrumental recordings that still holds up on repeated listening." In addition, author Charles Snider has noted in The Strawberry Bricks Guide to Progressive Rock that the album's "quiet yet sinister organ tones are more similar to Pink Floyd than anything fairy tale-like or electronic". In his review for the Dutch Progressive Rock website, Nigel Camilleri also likened the album to early Pink Floyd but was critical of its overall lack of variety and outdated keyboard and synthesizer sounds.

== Track listing ==
All tracks composed by Bo Hansson, original song titles in parentheses.

=== Side one ===
1. "Leaving Shire" (Första vandringen) – 3:28
2. "The Old Forest & Tom Bombadil" (Den gamla skogen / Tom Bombadil) – 3:43
3. "Fog on the Barrow-Downs" (I Skuggornas rike) – 2:29
4. "The Black Riders & Flight to the Ford" (De svarta ryttarna / Flykten till vadstället) – 4:07
5. "At the House of Elrond & The Ring Goes South" (I Elronds hus / Ringen vandrar söderut) – 4:40

=== Side two ===
6. "A Journey in the Dark" (En vandring i mörker) – 1:10
7. "Lothlórien" – 4:01
8. "Shadowfax" (Skuggfaxe) – 0:51
9. "The Horns of Rohan & The Battle of the Pelennor Fields" (Rohans horn / Slaget på Pelennors slätter) – 3:57
10. "Dreams in the House of Healing" (Drömmar i Läkandets hus) – 1:56
11. "Homeward Bound & The Scouring of the Shire" (Hemfärden / Fylke rensas) – 2:54
12. "The Grey Havens" (De grå hamnarna) – 4:57

=== 1988 CD reissue bonus tracks ===
13. "Findhorn's Song" – 1:36
14. "Before the Rain" – 1:30
15. "Fylke" – 1:52
16. "Playing Downhill into the Downs" – 1:45
17. "Wandering Song" – 3:16
18. "Excursion with Complications (Part One)" – 1:55
19. "Rabbit Music – Intro" – 0:38
20. "Attic Thoughts – Repose" – 2:18
21. "Attic Thoughts – Wandering" – 2:23
22. "Rabbit Music – Fiver" – 2:43
23. "A Happy Prank" – 3:17

=== 2002 CD reissue bonus track ===
13. "Early Sketches from Middle Earth" (Tidiga skisser från Midgård) – 8:52

== Personnel ==
- Bo Hansson – organ, guitar, Moog synthesizer, bass guitar
- Rune Carlsson – drums, congas
- Gunnar Bergsten – saxophone
- Sten Bergman – flute
- Peter Lindholm – cover painting (original 1970 release)
- Jane Furst – cover painting (1972 release)
- Rodney Matthews – cover painting (1977 reissue)

== Charts ==
Chart (1972–73)	Peak position
Australian (Kent Music Report)	31
UK Albums Chart	34
US Billboard Top LPs & Tape	154

== Release history ==
Music Inspired by Lord of the Rings was re-released by Charisma Records in 1977, with brand new cover artwork by fantasy illustrator Rodney Matthews. It was subsequently reissued in the United States in 1979 by PVC Records, with its original 1972 artwork intact. The album was first released on CD in 1988 as an "extended remixed version", with an additional eleven bonus tracks taken from Hansson's other 1970s albums Magician's Hat and Attic Thoughts. It was then reissued on CD for a second time in 1993 by Resource Records, again in a remixed version but without any bonus tracks. In 2002, the album was re-issued again by Silence Records and Virgin Records, with the inclusion of the previously unreleased bonus track "Early Sketches from Middle Earth".

Date	Label	Format	Country	Catalog	Notes
December 1970	Silence	LP	Sweden	SRS 4600	Original Swedish release with the title Sagan om ringen.
September 1972	Charisma	LP	UK	CAS 1059	Original UK release.
October 1972	Charisma/Buddah	LP	US	CAS 1059	Original US release.
1977	Charisma	LP	UK	CAS 1059	Re-release with new Rodney Matthews cover artwork.
1979	PVC	LP	US	PVC 7907	
1988	Silence	CD	Sweden	SRSCD 4600	"Extended remixed version" with eleven bonus tracks.
1988	Silence	LP	Sweden	SRS 4600	
1993	Silence/Resource	CD	Sweden	RESCD 508	
1996	Edsel	CD	UK	EDCD 493	
1996	One Way	CD	US	OW 33654	
2000	Silence	CD	Sweden	SRSCD 3600	CD re-release titled The Lord of the Rings/Sagan om ringen.
2002	Silence	CD	Sweden	CDV2960	CD re-release with one bonus track.
2002	Virgin	CD	US	12061	CD re-release with one bonus track.
