= Blissa Nova =

Studio album by Johan Christher Schütz
- Released: 2007
- Recorded: 2005–2007
- Genre: Jazz pop, bossa nova, world music
- Length: 49:01
- Label: Terrinha
- Producer: Johan Christher Schütz

Johan Christher Schütz chronology
Passion (2004)	Blissa Nova (2007)	C'est La Vie (2009)

Blissa Nova is the second album by Swedish singer and songwriter Johan Christher Schütz, released in 2007.

The title "Blissa Nova" is a play on the word bliss and the music style bossa nova.

Recorded between 2005 and 2007, Blissa Nova is arranged and produced by Schütz. Apart from Schütz' own songs, it includes covers of five well-known Brazilian and Swedish standards, in Schütz own translations: "Tristeza" (Luiz Bonfá), "Eu Vim da Bahia" (Gilberto Gil), "Pra Que Chorar" (Vinicius de Moraes/Baden Powell), "Underbart är kort" (Povel Ramel) and "Den lilla bäcken" (Allan Edwall).

Several of Sweden's best jazz and world-music musicians play on the album, such as Sebastian Notini (drums), Peter Asplund (trumpet) and Karin Hammar (trombone) and Cloudberry Jam's Henke Sundqvist (rhodes and piano). Brazilian singer Aline de Lima, was invited to sing a 2-language duet with Schütz in "This Sadness (Tristeza)", whereas Schütz sings his English lyric and de Lima sings the original lyrics in Portuguese.

== Track listing ==
1. "Plunge Into The Miracle"
2. "This Sadness (Tristeza)" featuring Aline de Lima
3. "When Happiness Attacks"
4. "Difficult"
5. "I Came From Bahia (Eu vim da Bahia)"
6. "Be For Real"
7. "What Good Are Tears (Pra que chorar)"
8. "Aurora"
9. "One Moment's Bliss"
10. "Prayer"
11. "Caged Birds"
12. "Wonderful Is Brief (Underbart är kort)"
13. "Little Stream (Den lilla bäcken)"
