= Sagor & Swing =

Swedish instrumental duo

Sagor & Swing is a Swedish instrumental duo that fused disparate musical genres such as jazz, electronic music, and Scandinavian folk music. The band consisted of Eric Malmberg (organ), and Ulf Möller (drums) Ulf Möller was replaced in 2007 by Fredrik Björling, who previously played in Dungen, The Amazing, etc. The band's sound was defined by Malmberg's distinctive organ playing. A major source of inspiration was organist Bo Hansson (formerly of Hansson & Karlsson), who collaborated with the group in a number of performances.

The duo formed in 1999, and released four albums between 2001 and 2004. Malmberg released a solo album in 2005. The band stopped playing live for a few of years, but started touring again in 2013, when they also released a new album. Ulf Möller rejoined the band in 2014, replacing Fredrik Björling.

The waltz "Vals på vingar" from Orgelfärger was featured in the HBO TV series Eastbound & Down in 2013.

== Discography ==
- Orgelfärger (Häpna H5 CD, 2001)
- Melodier och fåglar (Häpna H8 CD, 2002)
- Allt hänger samman (Häpna H12 CD, 2003)
- Orgelplaneten (Häpna H16 CD, 2004)
- Botvid Grenlunds park (Häpna H50 CD, 2013, also on iTunes)
- Modular (EP, January 29, 2020, Qvästlafve)
- En musikalisk tolkning av Bröderna Lejonhjärta (LP, August 26, 2020, Zeon Light)
- Moog på svenska (digital, 2025, PLX Records)
