= Music Inspired by Lord of the Rings (disambiguation) =

Music Inspired by Lord of the Rings may refer to:

- Music Inspired by Lord of the Rings (Bo Hansson album)
- Music Inspired by The Lord of the Rings (Mostly Autumn album)
