= Philemon Arthur and the Dung =

Swedish rock band

- Origin: Scania, Sweden
- Genres: Outsider music, lo-fi
- Years active: 1962–present
- Labels: Silence Records

Philemon Arthur and the Dung is a music group from Scania, Sweden, consisting of two members known only by their pseudonyms Philemon Arthur and the Dung. The band formed in the early 1960s under the name The Popbeams, which they changed before the release of their first album in 1972. The duo's true identities are most likely known only to a few individuals at Silence Records, the record label that the band has worked with since 1971. Philemon Arthur and the Dung do not want their identities to be known, lest those who live in their small village find out who they are.

The band's music is recorded on reel-to-reel tape decks with crackling microphones and is played on untuned guitars, accordion and a home-made drum kit built of tin cans and trays, with the occasional accompaniment of household objects such as saucepans, radiators and toy instruments. The lyrics vary from utter nonsense, to profoundly whimsical observations about everyday life, to satire concerning social phenomena such as homelessness, pollution, and hunting.

Despite their outsider-persona, the band has received much notice across Sweden. Their surrealistic self-titled debut won a Swedish Grammy for the best Swedish LP of 1972, which came to the dismay of many.

Modern Swedish bands like Stockholm band bob hund have been greatly inspired by Philemon Arthur and the Dung, and it was this eccentric duo who discovered and forwarded bob hund's demo tape to Silence Records.

Their songs have been covered by several Swedish artists including bob hund, Träd, Gräs och Stenar (even before PA&tD released their debut album) and Dom Dummaste. Their identities have not been revealed, but Magnus Uggla's 1987 cover of "In Kommer Gösta" was credited to Mats Larsson.

The obscure progressive band "Anna Koka 5 Ägg Jag Är Värd I Huset", hailing from the same area as PA&tD, has recently been the subject of speculations as after their 2022 reunion they have frequently played Philemon covers live and hinted that the band members and brothers Mats and Rolf Svensson are the same age as the members of Philemon Arthur and the Dung.

== Discography ==
- Philemon Arthur and the Dung (1971)
- Skisser över 1914 års badmössor (Eng. Sketches of the bathing caps of 1914) (1987)
- Musikens historia del 1 och 2 (Eng. The history of music part 1 & 2) compilation disc, (1992)
- Får jag spy i ditt paraply? (Eng. May I vomit in your umbrella?) (2002)
- "Får jag spy" Dubbelsingel med bob hund (2023)
