= Ingenting =

Ingenting may refer to:

- "Ingenting" (single), a 2007 single CD by the band Kent
- Ingenting (album), a 2002 bob Hund album
