= Omslag: Martin Kann =

Studio album by bob hund
- Released: 1996
- Recorded: 1995–1996
- Genre: Indie rock
- Length: 40:37
- Label: Silence Records
- Producer: bob hund, Per Sunding and Zqaty

Bob hund chronology
bob hund (1994)	Omslag: Martin Kann (1996)	Jag rear ut min själ! Allt skall bort!!! (1998)

Professional ratings
Review scores
Source	Rating
AllMusic	4/5 stars

Omslag: Martin Kann (translated: Cover: Martin Kann) is the Swedish band bob hund's second full-length studio album. The album actually has no title, but since the words "Omslag: Martin Kann" (meaning "Cover: Martin Kann") can be read on the cover, this has become its informal name. The cover is indeed designed by Martin Kann, who also features as the face on the front.

The album features mostly mid-tempo rock songs with humorous, slightly surreal lyrics, such as "Papperspåse", where the narrator wears a paper bag over his head, while riding the bus, noting a "un-swedish mood" around him. AllMusic praised the album, calling it "a more varied and dynamic album than 1994's rather one-dimensional Bob Hund".

The album peaked at number seven on the Swedish Albums Chart and number 28 on the Norwegian Albums Chart. The band, and the album, received the award for "Best Lyrics" at the 1997 Swedish Grammy Awards.

== Track listing ==
(English translation within parentheses)

1. "En pratstund" - 3:28 ("A Chat")
2. "Sommaren rasar" - 4:28 ("The Summer's Raging")
3. "Upp, upp, upp, ner" - 3:18 ("Up, Up, Up, Down")
4. "Förträngda problem" - 4:41 ("Repressed Problems")
5. "bob hund" - 2:06
6. "Reinkarnerad exakt som förut" - 4:26 ("Reincarnated Exactly Like Before")
7. "Nånting måste göras" - 4:04 ("Something Must Be Done")
8. "Indianernas park" - 4:07 ("The Indians' Park")
9. "Düsseldorf" - 3:53
10. "Papperspåse" - 6:00 ("Paper Bag")

== Charts ==
Chart (1996–1997)	Peak position
Norwegian Albums (VG-lista)	38
Swedish Albums (Sverigetopplistan)	7
