= Magician's Hat =

Studio album by Bo Hansson
- Released: Late 1972 (Sweden only); September 1973
- Recorded: 1970–1972
- Studios: Studio Decibel, Stockholm
- Genre: Progressive rock
- Length: 38:42
- Labels: Silence (1972 release); Charisma
- Producers: Anders Lind, Bo Hansson

Bo Hansson chronology
Music Inspired by Lord of the Rings (1970)	Magician's Hat (1972)	Attic Thoughts (1975)

Professional ratings
Review scores
Source	Rating
Allmusic	4.0/5 stars

Magician's Hat is an instrumental progressive rock album by Swedish musician Bo Hansson. It is his second solo album, following the successful Music Inspired by Lord of the Rings, and was originally released in Sweden by Silence Records in 1972, with the title Ur trollkarlens hatt.

== Recording and release ==
The genesis of the album can be traced back to the early 1970 recording sessions for Hansson's first solo album, Music Inspired by Lord of the Rings. As work on that album neared completion, the prolific Hansson also began working on additional material that was not intended for the album. After his debut album had been released in December 1970, Hansson continued to work on these left-over fragments and also composed additional material at his summer house in the Stockholm archipelago. Recording sessions for Magician's Hat took place at Studio Decibel in Stockholm, with contributions from a number of session musicians, including Rune Carlsson, Gunnar Bergsten, and Sten Bergman, all of whom were previous collaborators of Hansson's first solo album.

The album was released in Sweden in late 1972, at the same time that its predecessor, Music Inspired by Lord of the Rings, was being released to worldwide critical acclaim. It was subsequently licensed to Charisma Records and issued internationally as Magician's Hat in September 1973.

Like its predecessor, the album was, at least partly, influenced by fairy tale and fantasy themes, with the song "Elidor" having been directly inspired by Alan Garner's 1965 fantasy novel Elidor. Although the album had a similar progressive rock sound to Hansson's first solo album, albeit with a more jazz-tinged flavor, it was not as commercially successful and failed to reach the charts in the UK and the U.S.

In his review of the album for the Allmusic website, Bruce Eder has noted "there is a compelling power to some of this music, as organ, guitar, and synthesizer alternately move out in front". However, Eder also criticized the album for being "diffuse and lacking some of the energy of Lord of the Rings". On the Dutch Progressive Rock website, Nigel Camilleri has noted that the album saw Hansson "exploring a broader musical territory than he did on Lord Of The Rings" but he also criticized many of the tracks for being "snippets of musical ideas which had not been expanded on".

== Track listing ==
All tracks composed by Bo Hansson except where noted.

=== Side 1 ===
1. "The City" – 7:20
2. "Divided Reality" – 6:17
3. "Elidor" – 1:34
4. "Before the Rain" – 1:31
5. "Fylke" – 1:50
6. "Playing Downhill into the Downs" – 1:39

=== Side 2 ===
1. "Findhorn's Song" – 1:43
2. "Awakening" – 2:43
3. "Wandering Song" – 3:13
4. "The Sun (Parallel or 90°)" – 7:07
5. "Excursion with Complications" – 3:23

=== 2004 CD reissue track listing ===
1. "The City" [extended version] – 11:29
2. "Divided Reality" – 6:17
3. "Elidor" – 1:34
4. "Before the Rain" – 1:31
5. "Fylke" – 1:50
6. "Playing Downhill into the Downs" – 1:39
7. "Findhorn's Song" – 1:43
8. "Awakening" – 2:43
9. "Wandering Song" – 3:13
10. "The Sun (Parallel or 90°)" – 7:07
11. "Excursion with Complications" – 3:23
12. "The City" [edited version] – 7:20
13. "Waltz at Dawn" [previously unreleased outtake] (Bo Hansson, Kenny Håkansson) – 5:51

== Personnel ==
- Bo Hansson – organ, guitars, synthesizers, slide bass guitar, mellotron
- Rune Carlsson – drums, congas, cowbell
- Kenny Håkansson – electric guitar
- Rolf Scherrer – acoustic guitar
- Gunnar Bergsten – saxophone, flute
- Sten Bergman – flute
- Bobo Stenson – electric piano on "The Sun (parallel or 90°)"
- Owe Gustavsson – bass guitar on "The Sun (parallel or 90°)"
- Pelle Ekman – drums on "The Sun (parallel or 90°)"
- Göran Freese – saxophone
- Bill Öhrström – congas
- Jan Ternald – cover painting
