= Music Inspired by Watership Down =

Studio album by Bo Hansson
- Released: 1977
- Recorded: 1976
- Genre: Progressive rock
- Length: 47:03
- Label: Charisma (UK); Sire (USA)
- Producer: Bo Hansson, Pontus Olsson

Bo Hansson chronology
Attic Thoughts (1975)	Music Inspired by Watership Down (1977)	Reflection: Best of Bo Hansson (1983)

Professional ratings
Review scores
Source	Rating
Allmusic	2.0/5 stars

Music Inspired by Watership Down is a 1977 progressive rock album by Swedish musician Bo Hansson. The album is Hansson's fourth solo album and is, as its name suggests, built around musical ideas inspired by Richard Adams' heroic fantasy novel Watership Down.

== Recording and release ==
Music Inspired by Watership Down was the second album of Hansson's to have been based on a novel; his first solo album, Music Inspired by Lord of the Rings, had likewise been based on J. R. R. Tolkien's high fantasy novel The Lord of the Rings. Hansson had already composed and released a musical suite inspired by Watership Down on his previous album, Attic Thoughts. However, beyond its title, the Music Inspired by Watership Down album contains few overt references to the novel and instead features excerpts from the works of various poets, such as John Keats and Alexander Pope.

The album was originally released in Sweden as El-Ahrairah by YTF Records in 1977. This title was taken directly from the pages of Watership Down, with El-Ahrairah being the name of a trickster, folk hero-deity rabbit, known as "The Prince with a Thousand Enemies". The album was subsequently released with its English title by Charisma Records in the United Kingdom and Sire Records in the United States, but it failed to chart on either side of the Atlantic. Music Inspired by Watership Down was reissued on CD in 2004 by Virgin Records.

== Track listing ==
All tracks composed by Bo Hansson except where indicated.

=== Side 1 ===
1. "Born in the Gentle South" (Bo Hansson, Kenny Håkansson) – 16:35
2. "Allegro for a Rescue" – 1:23

=== Side 2 ===
1. "Legend and Light" (Bo Hansson, Kenny Håkansson) – 3:39
2. "Trial and Adversity" – 4:10
3. "The Twice – Victory" – 8:14
4. "The Kingdom Brightly Smiles" – 1:24

=== 2004 CD reissue bonus track ===
7. "Migration Suite" [live studio recording] (Bo Hansson, Kenny Håkansson) – 11:38

== Personnel ==
- Bo Hansson – piano, keyboards, guitars, bass guitar, tambourine
- Kenny Håkansson – guitar, bass guitar
- Bo Skoglund – drums, maracas
- Göran Lagerberg – bass guitar
- Tomas Netzler – bass guitar
- Sten Bergman – flute
- Torbjörn Ekman – wooden flute
- Fredrik Norén – drums
- Pontus Olsson – piano, engineering
