= Emmerdale (album) =

Studio album by the Cardigans
- Released: 18 February 1994
- Recorded: 1992–1993
- Studio: Tambourine Studios (Malmö, Sweden)
- Genre: Indie pop; pop rock
- Length: 44:01
- Label: Trampolene Records (Sweden); Stockholm Records (Europe); Minty Fresh (US)
- Producer: Tore Johansson

The Cardigans chronology
Emmerdale (1994)	Life (1995)

Singles from Emmerdale
- 1. "Rise & Shine" Released: May 1994; 2. "Black Letter Day" Released: August 1994; 3. "Sick & Tired" Released: September 1994

Professional ratings
Review scores
Source	Rating
AllMusic	3/5 stars
Entertainment Weekly	B
NME	7/10
The Rolling Stone Album Guide	3.5/5 stars

Emmerdale is the debut studio album by Swedish pop rock band the Cardigans. It was originally released in Sweden by Trampolene Records on 18 February 1994, and on 24 September 1994 in Japan. It was later reissued in the UK in January 1997 and in Canada in May 1999. A special U.S. version was released in August 1999 by Minty Fresh Records and features a bonus disc of songs from the Cardigans' second album Life. These songs were not released in the U.S. edition of said album and were previously unavailable on any U.S. release. The album was named after the British television soap opera of the same name.

== Track listing ==
All songs written by Peter Svensson and Magnus Sveningsson, except where noted.

International Version
No.	Title	Writer(s)	Length
1.	"Sick & Tired"		3:24
2.	"Black Letter Day"		4:31
3.	"In the Afternoon"		4:10
4.	"Over the Water"		2:13
5.	"After All..."		2:56
6.	"Cloudy Sky"	Svensson	4:07
7.	"Our Space"		3:30
8.	"Rise & Shine"		3:28
9.	"Celia Inside"		3:34
10.	"Sabbath Bloody Sabbath^{1}"	Butler, Iommi, Osbourne, Ward	4:32
11.	"Seems Hard"	Svensson	3:56
12.	"Last Song"	Sveningsson	3:21

U.S. Re-Release Bonus CD^{2}
No.	Title	Length
13.	"Pikebubbles"	3:02
14.	"Travelling with Charley"	4:11
15.	"Sunday Circus Song"	3:54
16.	"Closing Time"	10:22

^{1} Originally performed by Black Sabbath. ^{2} These tracks are from the 1995 album Life but were not included on the US version.

== Personnel ==
- Lars-Olof Johansson – acoustic guitar, piano
- Bengt Lagerberg – percussion, bassoon, drums, recorder
- Nina Persson – vocals
- Magnus Sveningsson – bass
- Peter Svensson – bass, guitar, percussion, piano, arranger, conductor, vocals, bells, vibraphone

Additional personnel

- David Åhlén – violin
- Ivan Bakran – grand piano
- Björn Engelmann – mastering
- Lasse Johansson – guitar, piano
- Tore Johansson – trumpet, producer, beats
- Anders Kristensson – photography
- Jens Lingård – trombone
- Andreas Mattsson – art direction, design
- Anders Nordgren – flute

== Charts ==
Chart (1994)	Peak; position
Swedish Albums (Sverigetopplistan)	29

== Certifications ==
Region	Certification	Certified units/sales
Japan (RIAJ)	Gold	100,000^{^}
Sweden (GLF)	Gold	50,000^{^}
^{^} Shipments figures based on certification alone.
