= Eggstone in San Diego =

Studio album by Eggstone
- Released: October 1992
- Recorded: 1991–1992
- Studio: Tambourine Studios, Malmö
- Genre: Indie pop
- Length: 35:33
- Label: Snap
- Producer: Tore Johansson and Eggstone

Eggstone chronology
Eggstone in San Diego (1992)	Somersault (1994)

Professional ratings
Review scores
Source	Rating
AllMusic	4.5/5 stars

Eggstone in San Diego is the debut album by Swedish indie pop band Eggstone, first released in Sweden in October 1992. The album was recorded over a period of a year, using second hand reel-to-reel tapes of dansbandsmusik, sometimes causing previous recordings to bleed through. Eggstone in San Diego is credited as being the album that established the "Tambourine Sound" and "introduced a completely new colour scheme to Swedish pop".

In June 2013, the album was ranked as the 39th-best Swedish album ever by Sonic Magazine.

The album is one of the titles in the book Tusen svenska klassiker (2009).

Eggstone in San Diego was re-issued on vinyl in 1997 by Vibrafon Records, and again by Crunchy Frog Records in 2017.

== Track listing ==
- All songs written by Eggstone
1. "Ooh Ooh Ma Ma Mine" – 4:13
2. "Shooting Time" – 3:29
3. "Those Words" – 3:42
4. "Sun King" – 3:31
5. "Have You Seen Mary" – 2:33
6. "Suffocation at Sea" – 3:36
7. "Wrong Heaven" – 3:46
8. "Go Back" – 3:23
9. "Can't Come Close Enough" – 3:32
10. "If You Say" – 2:27
11. "Beach Boy" – 3:37
12. "She's Perfect" – 4:27
13. "See the Good Things" – 4:10
