= Peacebird (album) =

Studio album by Johan Christher Schütz (Peacebird)
- Released: 2011
- Recorded: 2010–2011
- Genre: Soul, pop, funk, folk jazz, folk rock, contemporary R&B
- Length: 37:43
- Label: One Perfect Line Music
- Producer: Johan Christher Schütz

Johan Christher Schütz (Peacebird) chronology
C'est La Vie (2009)	Peacebird (2011)	Beautiful Place (2013)

Alternative cover
- International release album cover

Peacebird is the fourth album by Swedish singer and songwriter Johan Christher Schütz, first released eponymously under the pseudonym Peacebird in Japan on October 5, 2011, with a pre-release on iTunes Japan on the United Nations' International Day of Peace, September 21.

Outside of Japan the album is called Slow Down, after the first track, and just like his previous albums it was released under Schütz full name.

All songs are written, arranged and produced by Schütz, and the album has a wide range of influences, mainly 1970's soul, funk, pop and acoustic British folk. Schütz relaxed vocal style with jazzy phrasing and love for syncopations creates a tension, as most songs on the album are uptempo, such as the first track Slow Down which in deed is not a slow song at all.

The album was recorded in Sweden, Japan and Brazil with musicians such as Japanese bass player Reiji Okii, Brazilian drummer Di Stéffano, Swedish horn players Andreas Andersson (alto and soprano saxophones) and Karin Hammar (trombone), and some songs including groove by Glenn Fransson (bass) and Jocke Sandén (drums). Japanese guitar player Yoshinari Nakamatsu is also participating in two songs, and the backing vocals are sung by Swedish jazz singer Lovisa Lindkvist and Japanese soul singer Chihiro Fujita. Schütz plays all other instruments on the album, including guitar, piano, keyboards, cavaquinho, and also utilized loops and programmings in all songs in varying degrees.

A music video for the jazzy Pickin' Up The Pieces was published on YouTube along with the pre-release on iTunes Japan, showing extreme close-ups of Schütz' face with a crystal-clear image, working well with the song's melancholic theme of farewell.

The song Let The Sunlight In was originally released by Japanese singer Toki Asako on her 2008 album Touch.

During every day of the first week of the release, Slow Down was one of the three most played songs on Japanese FM radio stations in Tokyo and Kansai metropolitan regions, and two of these days the most played song. It was also the most played foreign song during all October.

There are two discrepancies between the original Japanese Peacebird edition and the later international Slow Down edition. On the Japanese Peacebird edition, the third track Anything For You accidentally received the same title as the fourth track Pickin' Up The Pieces on all digital platforms. This was rectified for the Slow Down digital release. The Original Japanese Peacebird CD included a download code for a free bonus track called Happy Birthday, an original song by Schütz written and recorded at the same time as the rest of the songs. For the Slow Down digital release this song was included as well.

== Track listing ==
1. "Slow Down"
2. "Baby Just Relax"
3. "Anything For You"
4. "Pickin' Up The Pieces"
5. "Let The Sunlight In"
6. "A Little Bit More Real"
7. "Don't Bring It Up"
8. "I Love You"
9. "After The Rain"
10. "Happy Birthday"
