= Låter som miljarder =

Studio album by bob hund
- Released: 2012
- Genre: Pop/rock/indie
- Label: Bob Hunds Förläg/Target

Bob hund chronology
Det överexponerade gömstället (2011)	Låter som miljarder (2012)

Låter som miljarder (Swedish for "Sounds Like Billions") is the seventh studio album by Swedish indie rock band bob hund. It was released on 15 February 2012. The first single, "Stanna klocka stanna", was released on 20 September 2011.

The cover of the album consists of 15 small ads for imaginary companies.

== Track listing ==
1. Låter som miljarder 2:42
2. Harduingetmankandansatill? (Don'tyouhaveanythingyoucandanceto?) 3:39
3. Vem tror jag att jag lurar? (Who Do I Think I'm Fooling?) 4:31
4. Varningsklockorna (The Warning Bells) 3:35
5. Darrande varulvshänder (Trembling Werewolf Hands) 2:20
6. Det regnar och brinner (It Rains and Burns) 4:23
7. Stanna klocka stanna (Stop Clock Stop) 2:57
8. Osmium & Iridium 2:56
9. Såå nära (Soo close) 2:55
10. Maskerade (Masked) 5:03
