= Sci-Fi SKANE =

Swedish musical duo

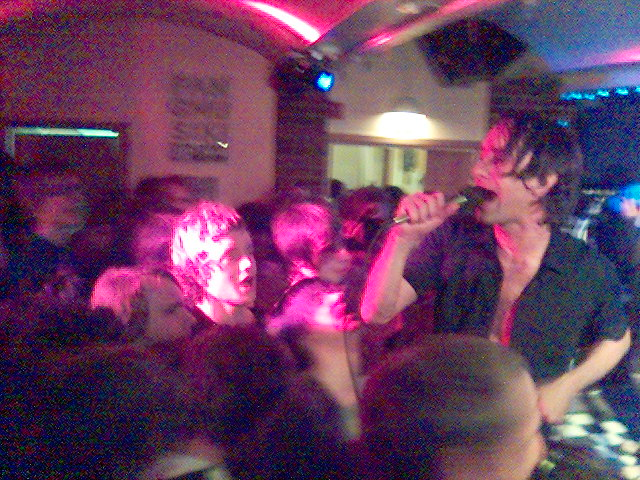

Background information
- Origin: Sweden Stockholm
- Genres: Punkrock, garage rock, indie rock
- Label: Silence Records
- Members: Thomas Öberg; Jonas Jonasson; Marcus Törncrantz

Sci-Fi SKANE is a musical collaboration of Swedish musicians Thomas Öberg and Jonas Jonasson, members of Swedish rock groups bob hund and Bergman Rock.

Sci-Fi SKANE was started in 2005, and the goal was stated as being to "create stupidity and dance".

The word SKANE in the name is regarded as an ironic anglification of Skåne, the area the band originates from.

Sci-fi SKANE's musical style is of the same nature as bob hund's and Bergman Rock's style, but without live drums, and dominated by keyboards and programmed sounds. However, the somewhat ironic tone known from bob hund and Bergman Rock is present both in the music and in the lyrics.

So far Sci-Fi SKANE has released two singles: a cover of Canned Heat's "Going Up The Country" called "Jag har aldrig bott vid en landsväg" and another song called "Vi kommer försent till bluesen".

The duo's debut album Känslan av att jorden krymper växer ("the feeling that the Earth shrinks grows") was to be released in Sweden by Silence Records on 16 November 2005, but due to errors in the printing of its phosphorescent cover, the release was delayed.

== Känslan av att jorden krymper växer tracks ==
No.	Title	Length
1.	"Hyresgästen"	3:33
2.	"Jag har aldrig bott vid en landsväg" (Cover of Canned Heat's song Going Up the Country in Swedish)	2:51
3.	"Känslan av att jorden krymper, växer"	4:24
4.	"Formulären"	4:11
5.	"Rösten som aldrig blir hörd"	1:30
6.	"Eld upphör"	3:06
7.	"Det overkliga tränger sig på"	3:20
8.	"Vi kommer försent till bluesen"	3:56
9.	"Hör"	1:10
10.	"Falla hårt, landa mjukt"	3:44
11.	"Valsen"	2:43
