= C'est la vie (J. C. Schütz album) =

C'est La Vie

Studio album by Johan Christher Schütz
- Released: May 2009
- Recorded: 2008
- Genre: Jazz, Pop, Acoustic, World music
- Length: 52:34
- Label: Terrinha
- Producer: Johan Christher Schütz

Johan Christher Schütz chronology
| Blissa Nova (2007) | C'est La Vie (2009) | Peacebird (2011) |

Alternative cover
- Japanese edition: C'est La Vie

C'est La Vie is the third studio album by Swedish singer and songwriter Johan Christher Schütz, released in May 2009 worldwide, with a pre-release in Japan in December 2008.

All songs are written, arranged and produced by Schütz. This international edition of C'est La Vie has five of the songs in English, whereas the original Swedish version, C'est La Vie - 11 sånger på svenska (C'est La Vie - 11 songs in Swedish), has all songs performed in Swedish.

The album received good reviews although some questioned why Schütz was singing in Swedish after two albums in English. Östgöta Correspondenten called it "well written" and "well played", and the music magazine Lira put more attention to detail, noticing that "Schütz has got a lot on his mind, a kind of nicely laid-back observations on life, where a smile is never far away". They continued, "Here we see an artist more down-to-earth, even if the world music influences are still evident. It's a bunch of songs where the lyrics have been given considerably more space than earlier".

The quality of Schütz songwriting on this album was also mentioned by Lira, in a different review of the Swedish version As If It's Never Taken Place (Som om ingenting har hänt) in the 2008 recording by Brazilian singer Aline de Lima from her album Açai. They wrote "It would be helpful for Lisa Nilsson and Lisa Ekdahl to listen to Som om ingenting har hänt. That is a Stockholm bossa nova that will conquer your heart instantly."

The musicians playing on C'est La Vie include awarded Swedish instrumentalists such as Olle Linder (bass, drums and percussion), Roman Andrén (rhodes & keyboards), Karin Hammar (trombone), Stefan Persson (trumpet), and a pandeiro performance by Sebastian Notini.

During the recording in 2008, Terrinha Records also made a short documentary about the recording sessions, which also included a section with Schütz singing acoustic versions of the songs. The subtitled documentary is now available on Video on YouTube.

== Track listing ==
1. "C'est la vie"
2. "Hey it's gonna be ok"
3. "Kan vi hjälpa att vi älskar att dansa"
4. "As if it's never taken place"
5. "Skuggor"
6. "Jabuticaba"
7. "Allt har sin tid"
8. "Balans"
9. "Hur ska man glömma"
10. "Svar"
11. "I guess it's ok"
12. "Quintessencia (club edit)" - bonus track
13. "As if it's never taken place (acoustic edit)" - bonus track
