= Jag rear ut min själ! Allt skall bort!!! =

Studio album by bob hund
- Released: 30 November 1998
- Genre: Indie rock
- Length: 41:34
- Label: Silence Records
- Producer: Zqaty and bob hund

Bob hund chronology
| Omslag: Martin Kann (1996) | Jag rear ut min själ! Allt skall bort!!! (1998) | sover aldrig (1999) |

Professional ratings
Review scores
| Source | Rating |
|---|---|
| AllMusic | 4.5/5 stars |

Jag rear ut min själ! Allt skall bort!!! (I'm selling off my soul! Everything must go!!!) is the third studio album by bob hund, released in 1998. The album peaked at number 17 on the Swedish Albums Chart.

== Track listing ==
(English translation within parentheses)

1. "bob hunds 115:e dröm" – 6:08 ("bob hund's 115th Dream")
2. "Tralala lilla molntuss, kom hit skall du få en puss" – 3:27 ("Tra-la-la Little Cloud Puff, Come Here and You'll Get a Kiss")
3. "Helgen v. 48" – 3:13 ("The Weekend, Week 48")
4. "Det är nu det börjar" – 3:18 ("It's Now That It Begins")
5. "Goddag & adjö" – 3:50 ("Good Day & Farewell")
6. "Nu är det väl revolution på gång?" – 3:47 ("The Revolution Is on Its Way Now, Isn't It?")
7. "Raketmaskinen" – 4:41 ("The Rocket Machine")
8. "Jag är inte arg" – 2:11 ("I'm Not Angry")
9. "bob hund: 1999" – 3:00
10. "Jag rear ut min själ" – 3:13 ("I'm Selling Off My Soul")
11. "bob hunds 115:e sång" – 4:46 ("bob hund's 115th Song")

== Trivium ==
The title of "bob hunds 115:e dröm" is inspired by Bob Dylan's song "Bob Dylan's 115th Dream" from his famous album Bringing It All Back Home.

== Charts ==
| Chart (1998–1999) | Peak position |
|---|---|
| Norwegian Albums (VG-lista) | 24 |
| Swedish Albums (Sverigetopplistan) | 17 |
