= Ingenting (album) =

Compilation album by bob hund
- Released: 27 February 2002
- Genre: Indie rock
- Length: 35:48

Bob hund chronology
Stenåldern kan börja (2001)	Ingenting (2002)	Folkmusik för folk som inte kan bete sig som folk (2009)

Ingenting is a compilation album by bob hund released in 2002. It contains demos recorded in 1992–93. Originally the album was limited to 1003 copies on vinyl but was later made available as free digital downloads on the band's website.

== Track listing ==
- "Hippodromen" – 6:14 ("The Hippodrome")
- "Kompromissen" – 3:21 ("The Compromise")
- "Allt på ett kort" – 2:58 ("All in One Card")
- "Den ensamme sjömannens födelsedag" – 4:10 ("The Lonesome Sailor's Birthday")
- "Ett ja som låter som ett nej" – 2:16 ("A Yes That Sounds Like a No")
- "Jacques Costeau" – 5:01
- "Telefonsamtal till mor" – 4:50 ("Phone Call to Mother")
- "Vem vill bliva stor?" – 5:35 ("Who Wants to Grow Up?")
- "Tack och godnatt" – 2:23 ("Thank You and Goodnight")
