= Stumfilm =

EP by Bob Hund
- Released: 2010
- Genre: Rock
- Length: 17:34
- Language: Swedish
- Label: Tambourine Studios, Malmö, Sweden
- Producer: Per Sundig

Bob Hund chronology
Folkmusik för folk som inte kan bete sig som folk (2009)	Stumfilm (2010)	Det överexponerade gömstället (2011)

Stumfilm (Silent Movie) is an EP by Bob Hund, released in 2010. The first and only single was "Festen Är Över" for which a music video directed by Jens Klevje & Fabian Svensson was created.

== Track listing ==
All songs written by Bob Hund:

1. "Leker Krig " – 3:20 ("Playing War")
2. "Festen Är Över" – 4:38 ("The party is over")
3. "Omringad Av Hjälp" – 5:48 ("Surrounded by help")
4. "Lögndetektorn" – 4:28 ("The lie Detector")
