= Det överexponerade gömstället =

Studio album by bob hund
- Released: 2011
- Genre: Pop/rock/indie
- Length: 43:44
- Label: Bob Hunds Förläg/Target

Bob hund chronology
Stumfilm (2010)	Det överexponerade gömstället (2011)	Låter som miljarder (2012)

Professional ratings
Review scores
Source	Rating
Dagens skiva	8/10 stars
Sydsvenskan	4/5 stars

Det överexponerade gömstället (The Over Exposed Hideout) is the sixth studio album by Swedish indie rock band bob hund. It was released on 16 March 2011. The first single, "Popsång (mot min vilja)" was released on 21 February.

The cover of the album is design by bob hund's household artist Martin Kann, but is simply an email from Kann stating "Jag har ingen omslagsidé. Sorry, /Martin" (I have no idea for a cover. Sorry, /Martin).

== Track listing ==
1. bob hund 2020 2:53
2. Tvångstankar (Obsessions) 5:43
3. Popsång (mot min vilja) (Pop Song (Against My Will)) 3:14
4. Stumfilm (Silent Movie) 7:30
5. Det överexponerade gömstället (The Over Exposed Hideout) 5:16
6. Lite av varje för ingen (A Little Bit of Everything for No One) 5:39
7. Letar oväder (Looking for a Storm) 3:00
8. Nu finns det bevis (Now There's Evidence) 0:45
9. Ja, ja, ja, nej (Yes, Yes, Yes, No) 5:09
10. I hamnens öga (In the Eye of the Harbour) 4:35
