= Beautiful Place =

Studio album by Johan Christher Schütz
- Released: 2013
- Recorded: 2012
- Genre: Jazz pop, acoustic, world music
- Length: 49:26
- Label: One Perfect Line Music
- Producer: Johan Christher Schütz

Johan Christher Schütz chronology
Peacebird (2011)	Beautiful Place (2013)	Tivolisaga (Original Swedish Cast Recording) (2018)

Beautiful Place is the fifth studio album by Swedish singer and songwriter Johan Christher Schütz, released on 28 July 2013 by One Perfect Line Music. Japanese record label IDÉE Records, a subsidiary of interior design company IDÉE, released the album on CD.

All songs are written, arranged and produced by Schütz, with the exception of Over the Rainbow, the classic musical theatre song from the 1939 musical movie The Wizard of Oz. Musically, it shows a return to his Latin and world music roots, also further exploring the acoustic folk and musical theatre which has been Schütz' main focus since 2013.

Beautiful Place was recorded in a seaside studio south of Tokyo, Japan, with mainly Japanese musicians - Show Kudo (bass), Kazuya Saka (piano & keyboards), Kaoru Suzuki (drums), and featuring Andreas Andersson (clarinet), who also performed on Peacebird.

The title song was released together with a shadow puppetry music video by Malaysian film maker JT Wong, based on his film Malaysian Wildlife, available on Video on YouTube.
