= Vive La Différence! =

Studio album by Eggstone
- Released: January 8, 1997
- Recorded: Tambourine Studios, Malmö, Sweden
- Genre: Indie pop
- Length: 42:43
- Label: Vibrafon
- Producer: Eggstone

Eggstone chronology
Somersault (1994)	Vive La Différence! (1997)

Vive La Différence! is the third album by Swedish indie pop band Eggstone, released in Sweden and Japan in January 1997. It was the first and only full-length release by the band on their own record label Vibrafon. The album was preceded by the single "Never Been a Better Day", as well as the sheet music for the entire album, in December 1996.

Vive La Différence!, along with the two previous Eggstone albums, Eggstone in San Diego and Somersault, were re-issued on vinyl in 1997 by Vibrafon Records.

== Track listing ==
- All songs written by Eggstone.
1. "Head Around" – 5:11
2. "Supermeaningfectlyless" – 3:20
3. "Birds in Cages" – 4:48
4. "Never Been a Better Day" – 4:40
5. "Taramasalata" – 4:32
6. "Il Trascurato" – 4:17
7. "April and May" – 3:30
8. "Marabous" – 4:26
9. "Still All Stands Still" – 3:00
10. "Neil" – 4:29

== Personnel ==
- Patrik Bartosch – Guitar, Backing vocals, Keyboards, Vibraphone
- Maurits Carlsson – Drums, Percussion, Backing vocals
- Per Sunding – Lead vocals, Bass
- Åsa Håkansson – Violin on "Birds in Cages" and "Taramasalata"
- Anna Bergström – Violin on "Birds in Cages"
- Gabriele Freese – Violin on '"Birds in Cages"
- Stefan Pöntinen – Violin on "Birds in Cages"
- Ronny Weber – Violin on "Birds in Cages"
- Sofi Sykfont – Flute on "Birds in Cages"
- Johan Fransén – Clarinet on "Birds in Cages"
- Gabriel Litsgård – Bassoon on "Birds in Cages"
- Ing-Marie Aronsson-Litsgård – Cor anglais on "Birds in Cages"
- Susanne Holmström – Violin on "Taramasalata"
- Inga Zeppezauer – Violin on "Taramasalata"
- James SK Wān – Bamboo Flute on "Taramasalata"
- Anna Sundborg – Violin on "Taramasalata"
- Petter Lindgård – Trumpet on "Taramasalata", "Still All Stands Still" and "Neil"
- Jens Lindgård – Trombone on "Taramasalata" and "Neil"
- Peter Dahl – Trombone on "Still All Stands Still"
