= Anton Furst =

English production designer (1944–1991)

- Born: Anthony Francis Furst; 6 May 1944; London, England
- Died: 24 November 1991 (aged 47); Hollywood, California, U.S.
- Education: Royal College of Art
- Occupation: Production designer
- Years active: 1974–1990
- Spouses: Jane Furst (m. 1968; div. 1977); Penny Fielding (m. 1990)
- Partner: Beverly D'Angelo (1991)
- Parent(s): Pamela and Ivor Furst
- Awards: Academy Award for Best Art Direction for Batman (1989)

Anthony Francis "Anton" Furst (6 May 1944 – 24 November 1991) was an English production designer who won an Academy Award for overseeing design of Gotham City and the Batmobile in Tim Burton's Batman (1989).

== Early life ==
Furst was born in London, to a Russian father and received a traditional English education. Excelling in drawing from a young age, he outperformed classmates but faced parental pressure to pursue medicine, briefly attending King's College. Disillusioned by its male-dominated, rugby-focused culture—and amid his father's struggles with alcoholism—he abandoned it for art. He enrolled at the Royal College of Art in the 1960s, studying illustration amid London's vibrant scene with the Beatles. There he met friend Bernard Tschumi, explored architecture departments, and discovered his passion for visual story-telling after watching 2001: A Space Odyssey and 8½.

== Career ==
Transitioning from a "meek illustrator," Furst apprenticed in special effects during the late 1970s boom, working on films like Alien, Superman, Star Wars sequels, Flash Gordon, Outland, and Raiders of the Lost Ark. He ran a small effects team, honing skills in models, miniatures, and matte paintings. His breakthrough came with The Company of Wolves (1984), directed by Neil Jordan, where he designed a gothic fairy-tale village blending influences from Bruegel, Samuel Palmer, Gustave Doré, and Arthur Rackham—built on soundstages to evoke a dreamlike, atemporal European forest.

He designed two award-winning television films, Just One Kid and It's a Lovely Day Tomorrow, for director/producer John Goldschmidt. Furst also worked as a special effects technician on Alien. Paul Mayersberg introduced him to a Nigel Phelps, whom Furst quickly hired after seeing his portfolio. Phelps would become Furst's primary draftsman to whom Furst would verbally dictate; after the initial drawing was completed Furst would add only details and accents on occasion. The debut of this partnership was for Neil Jordan's The Company of Wolves (1984); the charcoal illustrations of the sets caught the attention of Stanley Kubrick and a young Tim Burton. Kubrick hired Furst's company to create convincing Vietnam War settings, without leaving England, for Full Metal Jacket (1987). Burton tried to convince Furst to work on Beetlejuice at this time, but decided to do High Spirits instead, which was being shot in England. In 1990, Jon Peters convinced Furst to sign an exclusive contract with Columbia Pictures, promising him work as a director. Furst's directorial debut was to be MidKnight, a medieval musical fantasy starring Michael Jackson, but after extensive design work and planning the film never materialised. Furst's Columbia contract also prevented him and his employees from working on Batman Returns (1992). His final credited film was Awakenings (1990).

== Death ==
Furst killed himself on 24 November 1991. He had separated from his wife and begun taking Halcion, a sleeping drug that had been banned in Britain due to its possible side-effects of amnesia, paranoia and depression. His drinking also became more of a problem. He was scheduled to check into rehabilitation in 1992. On the night of 24 November 1991, he told his friends he was going to the car to fetch his cigarettes. Instead, he jumped off an eight-storey building.

He was survived by his daughter, son, mother and sister.
