= Passion (J. C. Schütz album) =

Studio album by Johan Christher Schütz
- Released: 2004 and 2009
- Recorded: 2003 – 2007
- Genre: Jazz pop, bossa nova
- Length: 54:10
- Label: Terrinha Records
- Producer: Johan Christher Schütz

Johan Christher Schütz chronology
Passion (2004)	Blissa Nova (2007)

Alternative cover
- 2009 re-release cover

Passion is the first album by Swedish singer and songwriter Johan Christher Schütz, originally released in 2004 in Sweden and Japan.

In 2009, Passion was released again, this time worldwide and including two bonus tracks, previously only available on the Japanese edition.

The album was recorded between 2003 and 2004, with Schütz as composer of all tracks, arranger and producer. The album uses a colourful instrumentation with accordion, vibraphone, strings and flute, on top of the guitar/piano/bass/drums arrangements. The bonus tracks were recorded in 2007.

Following the success in Japan, Japanese musical theatre production company Takarazuka Revue, which has a 100-year-old tradition of producing Broadway-like shows with all-female actors, translated the title song Passion into Japanese for their show Reimei no Kaze / Passion (Ai no Tabi) in 2008, which was released on both CD and DVD.

== Track listing ==
1. "Passion"
2. "There's Only You"
3. "All Because Of You"
4. "Think Of Me"
5. "So Happy"
6. "Pinch My Arm"
7. "Prague This Spring"
8. "Reach The Top"
9. "I'm Here"
10. "This Is Forever"
11. "Don't Turn The Page"
12. "Tousled Kitten Samba"
13. "Before You Go Away"
14. "Passion (surprise reprise)" - bonus track
15. "Light" - bonus track
