= Somersault (Eggstone album) =

Studio album by Eggstone
- Released: March 1994
- Recorded: Tambourine Studios, Malmö and MNW Studio, Waxholm, Sweden
- Genre: Indie pop
- Length: 35:33
- Label: Soap
- Producer: Michael Blair and Eggstone

Eggstone chronology
| Eggstone in San Diego (1992) | Somersault (1994) | Vive La Différence! (1997) |

Professional ratings
Review scores
| Source | Rating |
|---|---|
| AllMusic | 4.5/5 stars |

Somersault is the second album by Swedish indie pop band Eggstone, first released in Sweden in March 1994. A US release appeared later that year on BMG label Critique Records. The song "The Dog" was issued as a promotional single and became a hit on various college radio stations. The album was re-issued on vinyl in 1997 by Vibrafon Records, and again by Crunchy Frog Records in 2017.

== Track listing ==
- All songs written by Eggstone, except "Luck" written by Eggstone/Blair.
1. "Against the Sun" – 2:41
2. "It's Not the Rain" – 3:19
3. "Hang On to Your Eco" – 2:45
4. "Good Morning" – 3:38
5. "Desdemona" – 3:03
6. "The Dog" – 3:42
7. "Water" – 3:09
8. "Luck" – 3:50
9. "Cornflake Crown" – 3:15
10. "Split" – 2:41
11. "Happiest Fool" – 3:24

== Personnel ==
- Patrik Bartosch – Guitar, Backing vocals, Keyboards, Vibraphone, Glockenspiel
- Maurits Carlsson – Drums, Percussion, Backing vocals
- Per Sunding – Lead vocals, Bass
- Gunilla Markström – Violin on "Good Morning", "Luck", "Happiest Fool"
- Leila Forstén – Violin on "Good Morning", "Luck", "Happiest Fool"
- Nikola Zidarov – Viola on "Good Morning", "Luck", "Happiest Fool"
- James SK Wān – Bamboo Flute on "Good Morning"
