= Rise & Shine (The Cardigans song) =

1994 single by the Cardigans

Single by the Cardigans

from the album Emmerdale
- B-side: "After All..."; "Pikebubbles"; "Cocktail Party Bloody Cocktail Party"
- Released: May 1994
- Studio: Tambourine (Malmö, Sweden)
- Genre: Pop
- Length: 3:28
- Label: Trampolene
- Songwriters: Peter Svensson; Magnus Sveningsson
- Producer: Tore Johansson

The Cardigans singles chronology
"Rise & Shine" (1994)	"Black Letter Day" (1994)

1995 re-release

"Rise & Shine" is a song by Swedish band the Cardigans. It first appeared in 1992 on a limited edition 7-inch EP, The World According To..., and was the first Cardigans recording to feature Nina Persson (rather than Peter Svensson) as lead vocalist. Due to the positive response to the track, Persson became the group's permanent lead singer, and the song was re-recorded and released as the first single from their debut 1994 album Emmerdale. It was later re-recorded again for their second album Life and was re-released throughout Europe to promote the international version of the album.

International releases contained "Pikebubbles", a song omitted from the international release of Life; and "Cocktail Party Bloody Cocktail Party", an instrumental medley of songs from Life performed by Lars-Olof Johansson in the style of a lounge pianist, with background sound effects throughout to give the illusion of being performed in the midst of a cocktail party. The Life recording was also issued as a standalone single in Sweden, backed with previously released tracks from Emmerdale and Life. The Canadian EP release is unique in that it instead includes a selection of cover songs and was given the subtitle Under the Covers.

== Formats and track listings ==
Swedish CD single (1994)

1. "Rise & Shine" – 3:24
2. "After All..." (demo '93) – 2:36

UK 7-inch single (1995)

1. "Rise & Shine" – 3:24
2. "Pikebubbles" – 3:04

UK/European maxi CD single (1995)

1. "Rise & Shine" – 3:24
2. "Pikebubbles" – 3:02
3. "Cocktail Party Bloody Cocktail Party – 15:50

Japan CD single (1995)

1. "Rise & Shine (New Version)" – 3:30
2. "Iron Man" – 3:41
3. "Cocktail Party Bloody Cocktail Party" – 15:50

Swedish CD EP (1996)

1. "Rise & Shine" – 3:32
2. "Pikebubbles" – 3:02
3. "Over the Water" – 2:13
4. "In the Afternoon" – 4:10

Canadian CD EP (1996)

1. "Rise & Shine" – 3:32
2. "The Boys Are Back in Town" – 4:01
3. "Sabbath Bloody Sabbath" – 4:32
4. "Mr. Crowley" – 2:36
5. "In the Afternoon" – 4:10

== Charts ==
Chart (1996)	Peak position
Iceland (Íslenski Listinn Topp 40)	11
Scotland Singles (OCC)	34
UK Singles (OCC)	29
