= Jane Furst =

English artist (born 1944)

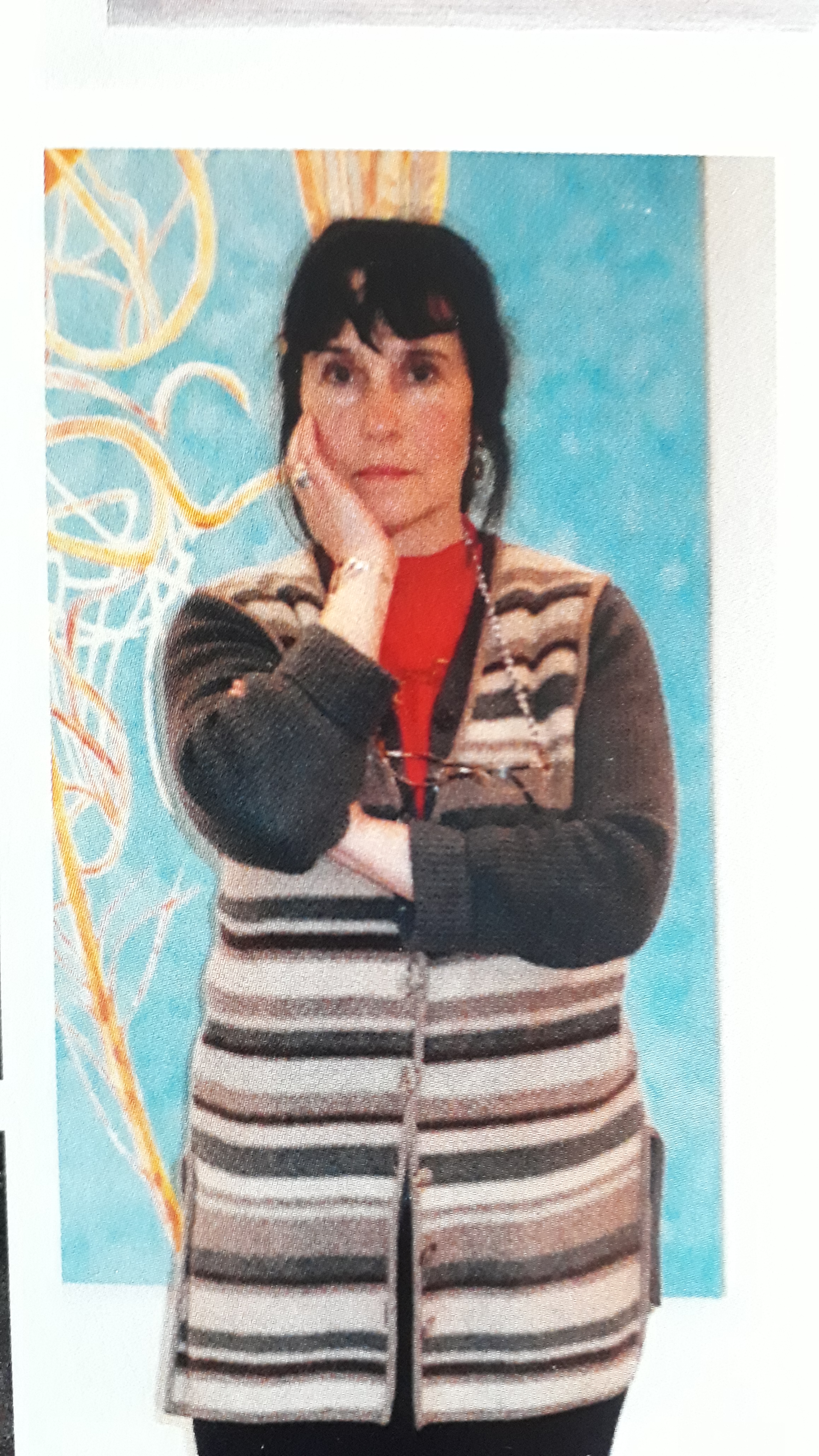
- Furst at Dartington Art gallery in 1999
- Born: July 21, 1944 (age 81); South Africa
- Occupation: Artist
- Spouse: Anton Furst (m. 1968; div. 1977)
- Website: www.janefurst.com

Jane Furst (born 21 July 1944) is an English artist.

== Career ==
Her work draws upon an interest in artists from the distant past, for example Northern Renaissance, from whom she borrows images, and also the study of natural form. She has done many etchings and Mezzotints inspired by the drawings and lithographs of Ernst Haeckel. She is interested in showing the monumentality of small things, such as the microscopic Radiolarian discovered by Haeckel.

One of the art books published by Furst and her daughter under the imprint Furst & King is on her late husband called Michael Copus, Museum Artist.

== Collections ==
Furst's work is held in the permanent collections of the Victoria and Albert Museum and the Wellcome Collection.

== Gallery ==
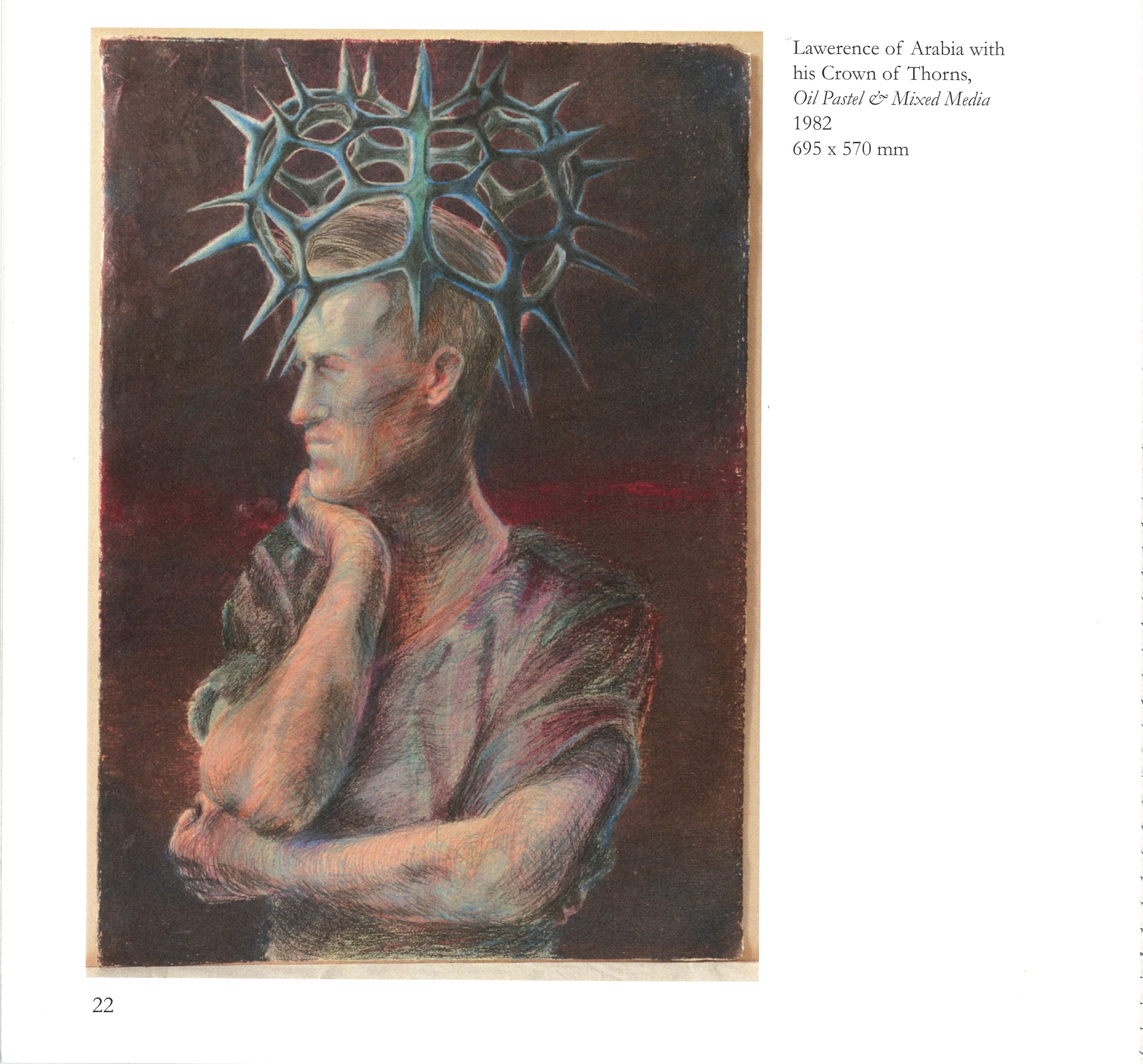
Lawrence of Arabia with his crown of Thorns 1983

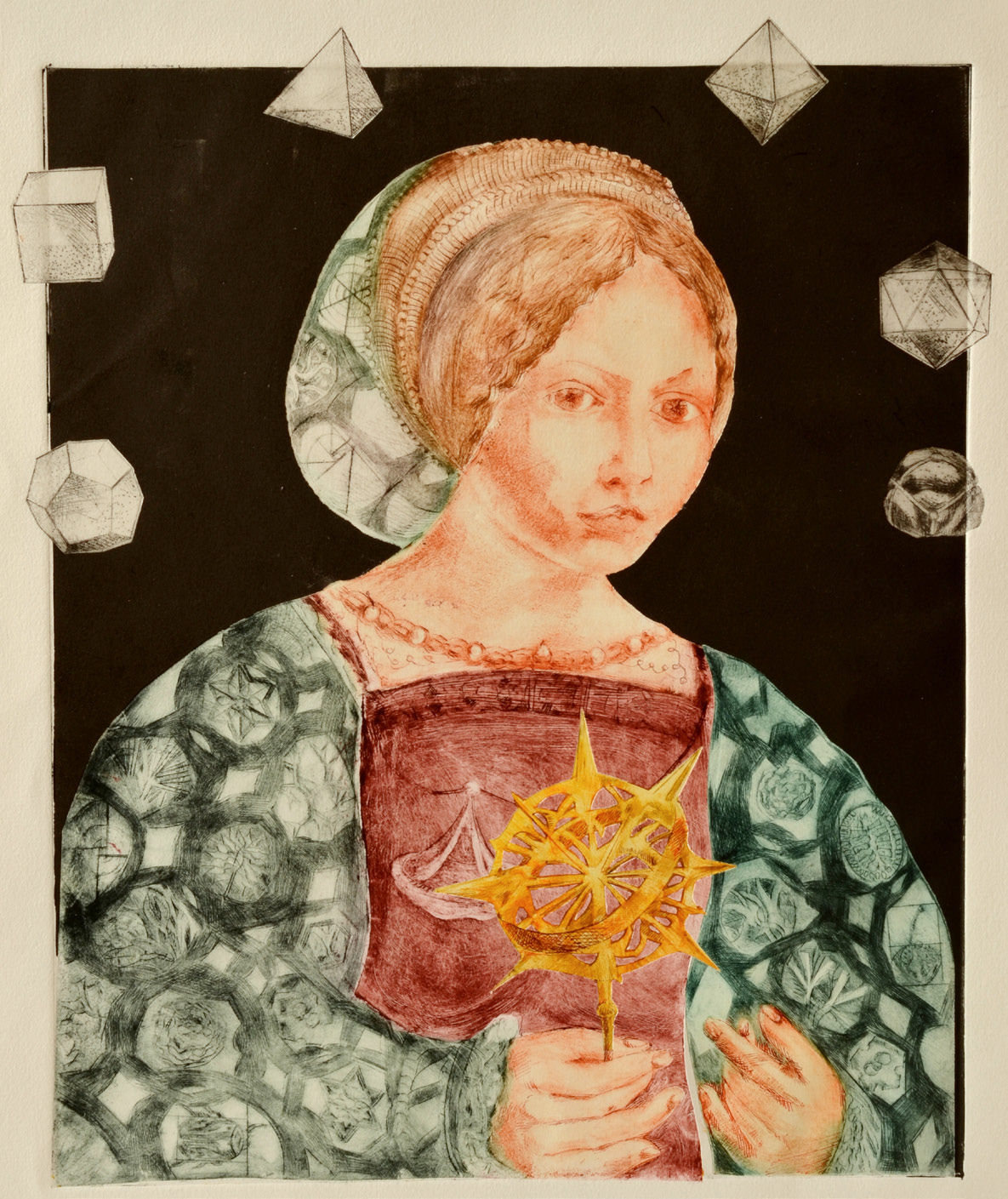
Mistress Gaia, Lovelocked. (Earth Goddess) 2016

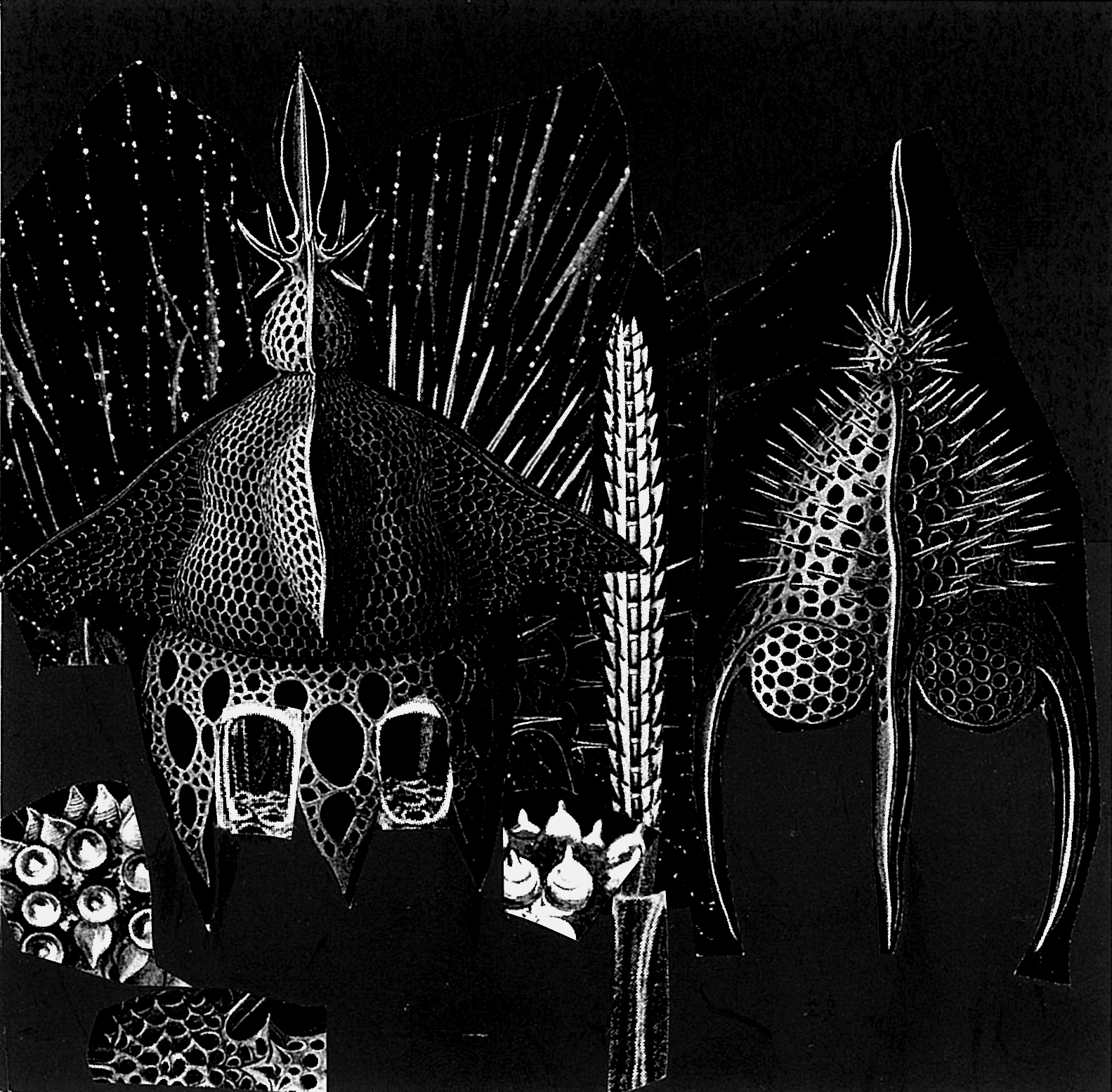
Night Warriors, 2012

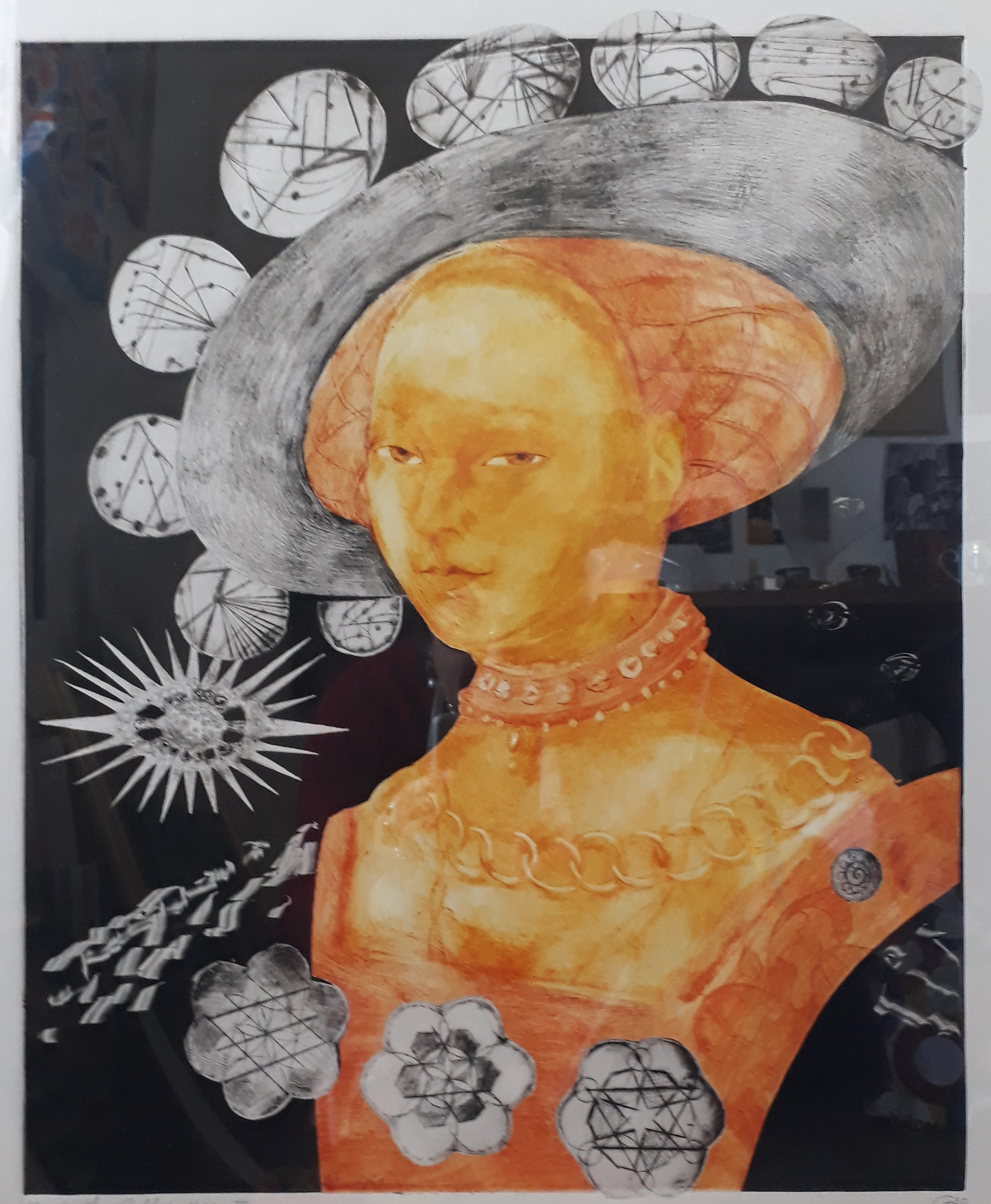
Knut, Sky Goddess, 2016 monotype etching

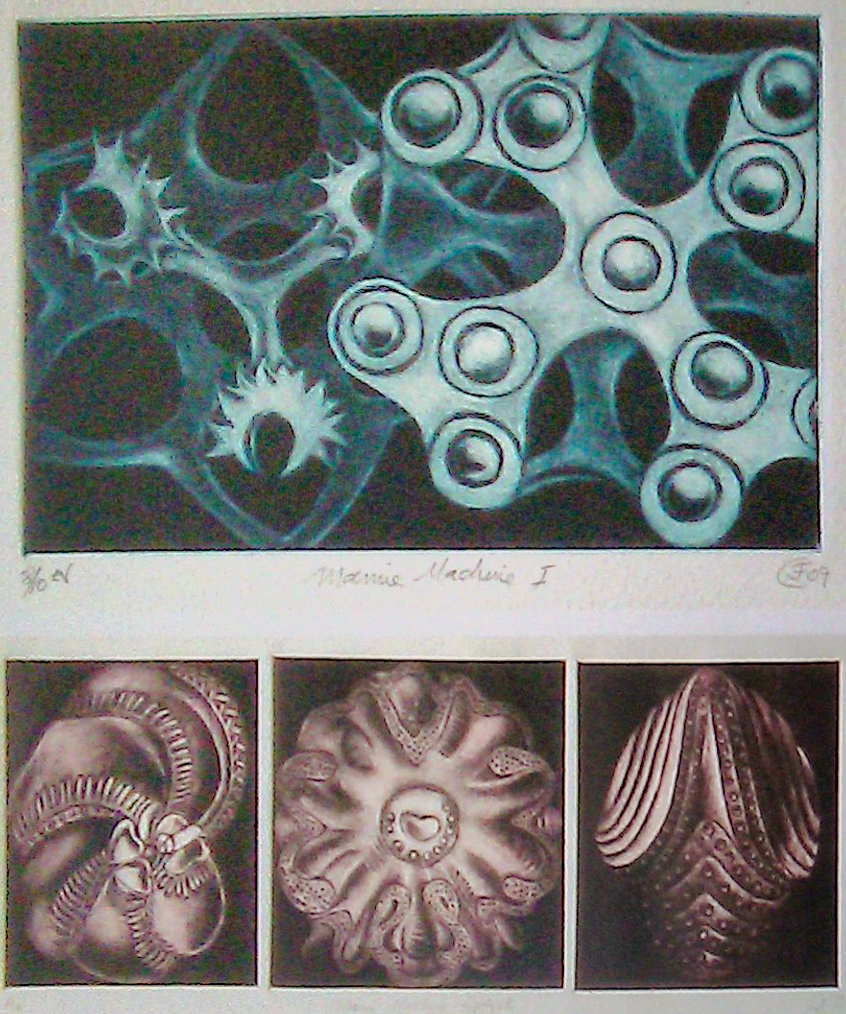
Marine Machine
