= Koppom =

- Location within Sweden
- Coordinates: 59°43′N 12°09′E
- Country: Sweden
- Province: Värmland
- County: Värmland County
- Municipality: Eda Municipality

Area
  - Total: 2.03 km^{2} (0.78 sq mi)

Population (31 December 2010)
  - Total: 643
  - Density: 317/km^{2} (820/sq mi)
- Time zone: UTC+1 (CET)
  - Summer (DST): UTC+2 (CEST)

Koppom (Swedish pronunciation: [ˈkɔ̂pːɔm]) is a locality situated in Eda Municipality, Värmland County, Sweden with 643 inhabitants in 2010.

== Notable people ==
- Per Eklund, rally driver.
- Solveig Ternström, actress.
- Mona Brorsson, olympic gold medal winner, biathlon.

== Sports ==
On the local football field the team Koppoms IK are playing.
