= Folkmusik för folk som inte kan bete sig som folk =

Studio album by bob hund
- Released: 2009
- Recorded: Tambourine Studios, Malmö, Sweden
- Genre: Pop/rock/indie
- Length: 42:24
- Label: Sousafon
- Producer: Per Sunding

Bob hund chronology
Stenåldern kan börja (2001)	Folkmusik för folk som inte kan bete sig som folk (2009)	Stumfilm (2010)

Folkmusik för folk som inte kan bete sig som folk is the fifth studio album by bob hund, released in 2009. The album peaked at number seven on the Swedish Albums Chart and number 13 on the Norwegian Albums Chart.

== Track listing ==
(English translation within parentheses)

1. "Folkmusik för folk som inte kan bete sig som folk" – 3:17 ("Folk music for folks who can't behave like folks")
2. "Bli aldrig som oss, bli värre!" – 4:17 ("Never become like us, become worse!")
3. "Tinnitus i hjärtat" – 3:55 ("Tinnitus in the heart")
4. "Världens bästa dåliga låt" – 4:05 ("The world's greatest bad song")
5. "Blommor på brinnande fartyg" – 4:48 ("Flowers on burning ships")
6. "Grönt ljus åt alla" – 5:58 ("Green light for everybody")
7. "Fantastiskt" – 5:18 ("Fantastic")
8. "Lösenord: stängdklubb" – 4:14 ("Password: closedclub")
9. "Ett litet ljus söker sitt mörker" – 0:46 ("A tiny light seeks its darkness")
10. "Siffran vill bli fel" – 5:40 ("The number wants to be wrong")

== Charts ==
Chart (2009)	Peak position
Norwegian Albums (VG-lista)	13
Swedish Albums (Sverigetopplistan)	7
