= Johan Christher Schütz =

Swedish songwriter and music producer

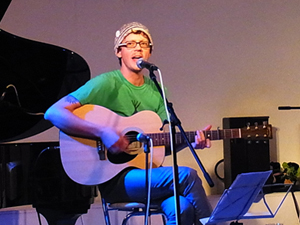
- Schütz performing in Tokyo in 2011

Background information
- Also known as: J.C. Schütz, Peacebird
- Born: Johan Christher Schütz; Sweden
- Origin: Mjölby, Sweden
- Genres: Pop, Bossa nova, Jazz, World music, Musical theatre
- Occupations: Songwriter, Music producer, singer
- Years active: 2004–2019
- Label: One Perfect Line Music

Johan Christher Schütz is a Swedish songwriter and music producer. He has also released music as a solo performer.

== Life and career ==
=== Early years ===
Born and raised outside the small town of Mjölby, Östergötland, he started singing and playing musical instruments, such as drums and electric organ, very early. Aged seven, he found a guitar in a dumpster, an experience that he says changed his life, as he decided to dedicate his life to music. Despite this, he entered the Kungshögaskolan College in Mjölby with the intention to study art, but the restrictive curriculum made him return to music. During a period in 1999 he lived in London after receiving a songwriting grant from Swedish royalty collection society STIM. He studied Portuguese at Stockholm University.

=== Musical theatre ===
In 2008, Japanese musical theatre production company Takarazuka Revue licensed a Japanese version of his song Passion for one of their shows, which inspired Schütz to start writing for musical theatre. The Swedish musical Tivolisaga, translated as Carnival Tale, based on Shakespeare's Romeo and Juliet but with the main characters renamed Punch and Judy, was written in close collaboration with director Johan Pettersson. It premiered in Norrköping, Sweden, in August 2013 in a small production at Arbisteatern. Following the success, Schütz and Pettersson staged a new Swedish production of Jonathan Larson's rock musical RENT, with Schütz as musical director.

=== Solo releases ===
Schütz has released five solo albums as a singer and performer, starting with Passion in May 2004, with jazz and bossanova influenced pop that was generally well received by the Swedish press. The second release Blissa Nova from November 2007 has a more contemporary and authentic Brazilian sound and had an even better reception by the Swedish press and also saw Schütz invited to do his first Japan tour. On his third album C'est La Vie he sang in Swedish for the first time, however the international edition included 5 songs translated into English.

In 2010 Schütz started writing songs for a fourth album and announced it would be released under the pseudonym Peacebird, and released two charity singles during the spring of 2011, Peace! (Give the People the Power Back) supporting the demonstrations for democracy in Northern Africa, and Hold On Now following the 11 March, Japan earthquake and tsunami. A full-length album, Peacebird, was released on 5 October 2011, and was more contemporary as Schütz had been experimenting with drum loops to further develop his influences from Brazilian and Cuban music. Slow Down, the first song on the album, was the most played song by a foreign artist on Japanese radio during October 2011.

In 2012 he returned to using his own name and released the single Christmas Time (We Can Change the World), a comment on the growing racism and nationalism around the world. In July 2013, his fifth album Beautiful Place was released, again leaning mainly towards his influences from Latin and world music, and featuring an acoustic version of the musical theatre classic Over the Rainbow.

2018 also saw the release of the Original Swedish Cast recording for Tivolisaga, and the instrumental soundtrack album Bull Rider Boy, with music he had written and produced in 2015 for a Swedish indie documentary film.

In 2019 he released his sixth solo album, Passion Revisited, a re-recording of the 2004 Passion album in jazz piano trio arrangements, and additionally saw Schütz playing the piano on all the tracks.

=== Producing other artists ===
Most notably Schütz has produced and played all the instruments on both albums for Japanese duo Mamerico. The alternatively prodcued albums have received cult status and gained the band a world-wide following. Schütz has arranged the music and also played all the instruments on the recordings.

=== Other versions of his songs ===
Brazilian singer Aline de Lima recorded a version of Schütz' song Som om ingenting har hänt for her 2008 album Açai, and Japanese singer Toki Asako recorded his song Let the Sunlight In for her 2009 album Touch. Also in 2008, a Japanese version of his song Passion was used by Takarazuka Revue in one of their all-female-cast shows, also released on CD and DVD. In 2011, Swedish jazz singer Nina Ripe released her debut album with new versions of Brazilian standards, with three lyrics written by Schütz, such as the first official English version of Jobim & Buarque's classic song Retrato Em Branco E Preto (Picture in Black and White), and a Swedish version of Milton Nascimento's Encontros e Despedidas (Möten och avsked) which Schütz released his own version of in 2014. Ripe's album was nominated in the category Best Album of the Year by Sweden's leading jazz magazine Orkesterjournalen.

== Discography ==
=== Albums ===
- Passion (2004)
- Blissa Nova (2007)
- C'est la vie (2009)
- Peacebird (2011)
- Beautiful Place (2013)
- Passion Revisited (2019)

=== Singles ===
- "Se solen gå upp" (2009)
- "Dröm" (2009)
- "Balans (Bossa Remix)" (2009)
- "Peace! (Give the People the Power Back) [Peacebird Edit]" (2011)
- "Hold On Now" (2011)
- "Christmas Time (We Can Change the World)" (2012)
- "I Guess It's Ok" (2014)
- "Det kunde lika gärna varit vi" (2014)
- "Möten och avsked" (2014)
- "I'm Here (Acoustic Version)" (2015)
- "Changes Changes (Nujabes Tribute Remix)" (2016)
- "Love This World" (2017)
- "Difficult (Impossible Remix)" (2017)
- "Let the Sunlight In" (2018)

=== Musical cast album ===
- Tivolisaga (Original Swedish Cast Recording) (2018)

=== Film soundtrack album ===
- Bull Rider Boy (2019)
