= Eric Malmberg =

- Origin: Sweden
- Occupation: Instrumentalist
- Instruments: Keyboard, Hammond organ

Eric Malmberg is a musician from Sweden. Previously a member of the duo Sagor & Swing ("Fairytales & Swing"), in 2005 he released his first solo album, Den gåtfulla människan ("The Enigmatic Human"). The album consists only of sounds played on the Hammond organ. The album is centered on a musical exploration of the human psyche and the different tracks have names such as "The Subconscious" and "The Dual-personalities". The different tracks are all linked together and form a seamless journey into the human mind.

Far from being the product of a loose interest in psychology, these themes are deeply personal as Malmberg has been fighting an ongoing struggle with his own autistic spectrum disorder. He has appeared in a documentary entitled Creative Illness which consists of interviews of skilled Swedish artists who have received a mixed blessing in the form of different mental afflictions. In this documentary, Malmberg speaks of his sometimes manic relationship with music in general and the Hammond-organ in particular.

Malmberg has also worked as a cartoonist. He drew a comic strip entitled Hansson & Karlsson i världsrymden (Hansson & Karlsson in outer space), which appeared in the Swedish newspaper Dagens Nyheter in 2000. The strip refers to Bo Hansson and Janne Carlsson, a Swedish instrumental duo from the late 1960s. Later, Hansson gave Malmberg the organ used on Hansson's Lord of the Rings album. This together with his participation in Sagor & Swing and the fact that Malmberg and Hansson have performed together on several occasions has led many to view Malmberg as Hansson's spiritual successor, preserving and evolving the style pioneered by Hansson & Karlsson.

In 2007, his second solo album Verklighet & Beat ("Reality & Beat" - the antonym of "Fairytales & Swing") was released.
