= Bo Hansson =

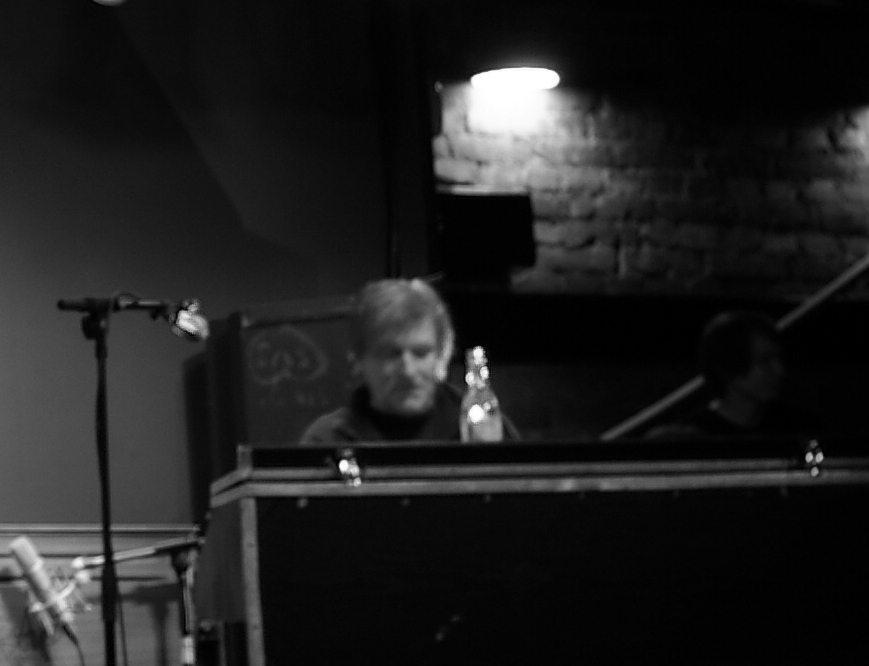
- Hansson in 2007

Background information
- Born: 10 April 1943; Sweden
- Died: 23 April 2010 (aged 67) Stockholm, Sweden
- Genres: Progressive rock
- Occupation: Musician
- Instruments: Hammond organ, guitar
- Years active: 1960s–2010
- Labels: Polydor, Silence, Famous Charisma, Sire
- Formerly of: Hansson & Karlsson

Bo Hansson (10 April 1943 – 23 April 2010), also known as Bosse Hansson, was a Swedish musician best known for his four instrumental progressive rock studio albums released throughout the 1970s.

== Early life and musical career ==
Hansson spent his early life in a village in the pine forests of Jämtland in northern Sweden, but a change in his parents' fortunes forced a move to Stockholm and they left the young Hansson behind, in the care of family friends. As a teenager he joined his parents in Stockholm, where he taught himself to play the guitar and joined the band Rock-Olga.

Later he joined 'Slim Notini's Blues Gang' as a guitarist, before forming his own blues group The Merrymen, who supported The Rolling Stones on an early Scandinavian tour.

In 1966, Hansson saw American jazz organist Jack McDuff perform at Stockholm's Gyllene Cirkeln Club, and was so captivated by the performance that he decided to leave The Merrymen to expand his musical horizons. Encouraged by fellow Merryman Bill Öhrström, he eventually acquired his own Hammond organ. Öhrström became an A&R man and producer at Polydor Sweden, and introduced Hansson to other musicians, one of whom was drummer Janne Carlsson. Hansson and Carlsson immediately hit it off and were signed by Polydor under the band name Hansson & Karlsson, playing up-tempo Hammond organ based music and releasing three albums between 1967 and 1969. They became immensely popular in their home country and some parts of Europe, and even reached the ear of Jimi Hendrix, who took time out from his tour to jam with the duo, along with George Clemons on drums and Georg Wadenius on guitar, at the Klub Filips in Stockholm in late 1967. Hendrix went on to record a Hansson song, "Tax Free". "Tax Free" appears on War Heroes, South Saturn Delta, and various live bootleg recordings.

== Solo debut ==
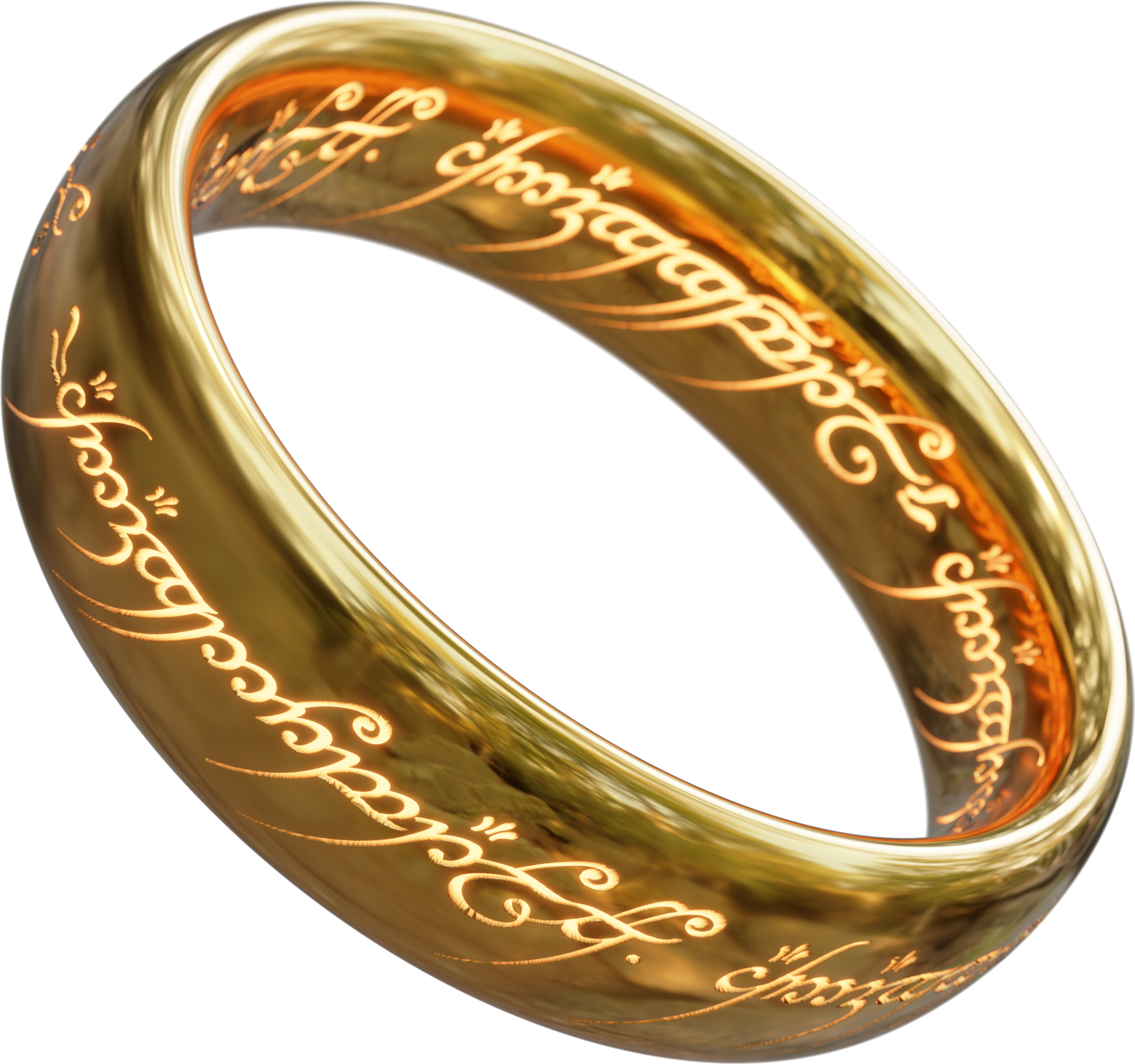
Hansson's 1969 debut album was inspired by his pleasure in J.R.R. Tolkien's The Lord of the Rings.

By 1969, Janne Carlsson had become a successful comedian and TV host, and Hansson decided to break up the partnership. Entranced by a copy of J.R.R. Tolkien's The Lord of the Rings, which he had purloined from his girlfriend, he moved into a friend's vacant apartment and started writing. When the unfortunate friend returned, he found that he had been evicted from his apartment after numerous complaints about the noise Hansson was creating. Hansson retreated to a remote cottage on an island off Stockholm where he, drummer Rune Carlsson and engineer Anders Lind, who had worked previously with Hansson & Karlsson, spent the winter of 1969 recording what was to become Hansson's debut solo album on a borrowed four track recorder. The resourceful Lind was even able to gain use of the only eight track recorder in Sweden at that time at the Swedish National Radio station, on the pretext that he was interested in buying one himself and wanted to test it. Once there, he persuaded session musicians Gunnar Bergsten and Sten Bergman to flesh out the recordings.

Sagan Om Ringen was released on Silence Records (Sweden's first independent record label, set up by Anders Lind) in autumn 1970 and became a huge hit. Copies of the album began to filter across to Britain where it came to the attention of Tony Stratton Smith, who was so impressed that he released the album as Music Inspired by Lord of the Rings on his own Charisma Records label in September 1972. The album reached the Top 40 on the UK Album Chart.

== Further musical career ==
Encouraged by the success of his first album, Hansson was booked into Stockholm's Studio Decibel where he began work on the follow-up. Using the same team, along with guitarist Kenny Håkansson, the new recordings benefitted from the superior equipment and Ur Trollkarlens Hatt was released on Silence Records in late 1972, and on Charisma in the UK as Magician's Hat in October 1973. Although critically acclaimed, it failed to reach the popularity of the earlier work, and did not chart in the UK.

Popularity in Sweden, however, put pressure on Hansson to tour, and a touring band was hastily assembled. The tour was cancelled by the reclusive keyboard player, however, citing a lack of motivation. Instead, he returned to Studio Decibel and started work on his third album. Using the tried and trusted backing musicians the recordings continued the progression of the previous album, and Mellanväsen was issued on Silence Records in October 1975, and as Attic Thoughts on Charisma in the UK in February 1976. Despite being the most accomplished record to date it was disappointingly received, although it did feature the song "Rabbit Music" which would point the way to Hansson's next album.

In 1976 Hansson and Silence Records parted company, and he was able to negotiate a worldwide deal with Charisma. He returned to Studio Decibel and began work on recordings inspired by another book: Richard Adams' Watership Down. Using the same session musicians but with a new producer, Pontus Olssen, the recordings were issued in September 1977 as El 'Ahrairah (after the novel's rabbit god) and Music Inspired by Watership Down on Charisma in the UK and Canada, and on Sire Records in the US. Another disappointing chart performance led to Hansson's withdrawal from the popular music scene, and though he worked on a number of projects with friends, little was heard from him until 1985 when he released, in Sweden only, the album Mitt I Livet (In the Middle of Life) on Silence Records (SRS 4700). He then fell into obscurity.

== Later years ==
Hansson later found a new following amongst Swedish DJs, who sampled his music – something which apparently pleased him enormously. Although the better known Music Inspired by Lord of the Rings made it onto CD in 1988, in a remixed version accompanied by selected tracks from Magician's Hat and Attic Thoughts, his other 1970s albums were reissued in 2005 on CD by Silence Records (through EMI), digitally re-mastered and with previously unreleased extra material. In 1998 Hansson & Karlsson reunited for some live concerts and a compilation album.

Due to his pioneering work and the mysteries surrounding Hansson & Karlsson's rise and fall, Hansson became a living legend among the independent musical community in Sweden. He occasionally performed live sets with fellow organist Eric Malmberg who was greatly inspired by Hansson's work. Hansson died in Stockholm on 23 April 2010.

== Discography ==
=== As Bo Hansson ===
==== Studio albums ====
- 1972 Music Inspired by Lord of the Rings, Charisma (originally released in Sweden as Sagan om ringen in 1970)
- 1973 Magician's Hat, Charisma (originally released in Sweden as Ur trollkarlens hatt in 1972)
- 1975 Attic Thoughts, Charisma (released in Sweden as Mellanväsen)
- 1977 Music Inspired by Watership Down, Charisma (released in Sweden as El-Ahrairah)
- 1985 Mitt i livet, Silence Records (released only in Sweden)

==== Compilation ====
- 1983 Reflection: Best of Bo Hansson, Fontana Records (compilation album covering Bo's first three solo albums)

The CD reissues of the first three solo records are distributed internationally by the original company, Silence Records.

=== As Hansson and Karlsson ===
- 1967 Monument
- 1968 Rex
- 1969 Man at the Moon
- 1998 Hansson & Karlsson (compilation)
- 2010 For People in Love 67–68 (studio & live recordings)

== See also ==
- List of Swedes in music
