= Attic Thoughts =

Studio album by Bo Hansson
- Released: April 1975
- Recorded: 1974–1975
- Studio: Bo Hansson's home and Studio Decibel, Stockholm
- Genre: Progressive rock
- Length: 37:07
- Label: Charisma
- Producer: Anders Lind, Bo Hansson

Bo Hansson chronology
Magician's Hat (1972)	Attic Thoughts (1975)	Music Inspired by Watership Down (1977)

Professional ratings
Review scores
Source	Rating
Allmusic	2.5/5 stars

Attic Thoughts is a 1975 instrumental progressive rock album by Swedish musician Bo Hansson.

== Recording and release ==
The album was recorded during 1974 and 1975 at Studio Decibel in Stockholm, and at Hansson's home, which had virtually become a studio by this point in his career. The album featured contributions from many of the same session musicians and friends that had played on Hansson's previous album, Magician's Hat. In addition to featuring Hansson's usual blend of other-worldly progressive rock and fairy tale-like ambiance, Attic Thoughts includes a suite named "Rabbit Music", which was inspired by Richard Adams' novel Watership Down, a subject which Hansson would explore further on his 1977 album Music Inspired by Watership Down.

In Hansson's native Sweden, Attic Thoughts was released with the Swedish title of Mellanväsen. It was released with its English title in April 1975 by Charisma Records, but was less commercially successful than Hansson's preceding solo albums and failed to reach the charts in the UK or the United States.

== Track listing ==
All tracks composed by Bo Hansson except where indicated.

=== Side 1 ===
1. "Attic Thoughts: a) March b) Repose c) Wandering" – 5:33
2. "Time and Space" – 1:39
3. "Waiting..." (Bo Hansson, Kenny Håkansson) – 7:34
4. "Waltz for Interbeings" – 3:26

=== Side 2 ===
1. "Time for Great Achievements" – 3:11
2. "The Hybrills" – 1:24
3. "Rabbit Music: a) General Woundwort b) Fiver" – 6:30
4. "Day and Night" – 4:33
5. "A Happy Prank" – 3:17

=== 2004 CD reissue bonus track ===
10. "The Crystal Suite: a) Crystals b) Memories of Darkness c) Light Again" – 6:21

== Personnel ==
- Bo Hansson – organs, guitars, bass guitar, synthesizer, mellotron, special effects
- Rune Carlsson – drums
- Kenny Håkansson – electric guitar
- Göran Lagerberg – bass guitar, acoustic guitar
- Gunnar Bergsten – saxophone
- Rolf Scherrer – acoustic guitar
- Tomas Netzler – bass guitar
- Mats Glenngård – violin
- Anders Oredsson – mixing on "Waiting..."
- Jan Ternald – cover painting
- Barry Lester and Company – artwork

== Releases ==
- CD Attic Thoughts One Way Records 1996
- CD Attic Thoughts EMI Music Distribution 2004
- CD Attic Thoughts Virgin 2004
- CD Attic Thoughts [Bonus Track] EMI Music Distribution 2005
