= Hansson & Karlsson =

Swedish musical duo

- Genres: Instrumental rock; jam rock; psychedelic rock; jazz fusion
- Years active: 1967–1969
- Past members: Bo Hansson; Janne 'Loffe' Carlsson

Hansson & Karlsson was a Swedish duo consisting of Bo Hansson (organ) and Janne Carlsson (drums). The name Carlsson being written with a K instead of a C in the name of the band was initially just a mis-print in an early poster (both spellings being common in Swedish).

The band was active in the last few years of the 1960s and played instrumental jazz fusion, largely based on improvisation and are considered one of the pioneers of progressive rock. Hansson and Carlsson played a few times with Jimi Hendrix in Stockholm, and Hendrix recorded the Hansson & Karlsson piece "Tax Free". After a few years the duo split, Hansson continued his musical career whereas Carlsson focused on his acting career.

Hansson died in 2010. Carlsson died of liver cancer in August 2017 at the age of 80.
