= Cloudberry Jam =

Swedish pop group

- Origin: Linköping, Sweden
- Genre: Indie pop
- Years active: 1991–1998; 2004–present
- Members: Jennie Medin (vocals); Jörgen Wärnström (guitar, vocals); Henrik Sundqvist (guitar, piano, vibraphone, vocal)
- Past members: Per Byström (drums, percussion); Per Valsinger (bass)

Cloudberry Jam is a Swedish pop group, active from 1991 to 1998 and from 2004 onwards.

== History ==
The group was formed as an indie pop band in Linköping student circles in 1991. The music they played was described later as "guitar mangling", but soon developed it into a style similar to Komeda and The Cardigans: a blend of Motown, the Beatles, jazz, easy listening, bossa nova and indie pop played with technical skills, with some melancholy and sadness. This genre was later called Twee Pop or Chamber Pop.

Critics often compared Cloudberry Jam with The Cardigans, almost always to the latter's favor. Although the group had an overseas success (over 100,000 albums sold in Japan) they never had a major breakthrough coming back home. When vocalist Jennie Medin chose to focus on her academic career in 1998, the group was dissolved.

A few years later, Medin played on the solo album The World Through My Eyes with songs by Jorgen Warnstrom, which was released in Japan and Sweden in the winter of 2003–2004. After that, it was decided to reunite the group, then as a trio. In 2004 came the album The Great Escape, followed by Movin 'on up, released only in Japan.

== Discography ==
Label: NONS (North of No South)

- La La La (EP, 1992)
- The Art of Being Cool (EP, 1994)
- Blank Paycheck (1995)
- Going Further (collection, 1996)
- Providing the Atmosphere (1996)
- The Impossible Shuffle (1997)

Label: Handcuts

- The great escape (2004)
- Movin' on up (2005)
- Right here, right now (2006)
- A Good day is coming (2009)

Label: Farmer Boy

- Now and Then (2013)
- Brick by brick, stone by stone (2013)
- We move like we are dancing (EP, 2015)
