= Stenåldern kan börja =

Studio album by bob hund
- Released: 2001
- Genre: Indie rock
- Length: 39:42

Bob hund chronology
sover aldrig (1999)	Stenåldern kan börja (2001)	Ingenting (2002)

Professional ratings
Review scores
Source	Rating
AllMusic	4/5 stars

Stenåldern kan börja is the fourth studio album by bob hund, released in 2001. This was the band's first album to chart at number one in Sweden.

== Track listing ==
(English translation within parentheses)

1. "1002" – 0:55
2. "Dansa efter min pipa" – 3:19 ("Dance to My Pipe")
3. "Sista beställningen" – 2:39 ("Last Orders")
4. "Papperstrumpeten" – 4:26 ("The Paper Trumpet")
5. "F.ö. stal hon mitt hjärta" – 3:18 ("By the Way, She Stole My Heart")
6. "Och där står du" – 2:23 ("And There You Stand")
7. "En som stretar emot" – 4:09 ("One Who Is Resisting")
8. "Glöm allt du lärt dig" – 3:10 ("Forget All You've Learned")
9. "Ner på jorden" – 3:14 ("Down to Earth")
10. "Skall du hänga med? Nä!!" – 2:49 ("Are You Coming Along? Nah!!")
11. "Stora tankar i lilla berg- och dalbanan" – 3:58 ("Big Thoughts in the Little Rollercoaster")
12. "Våffeljärnet" – 2:40 ("The Waffle Iron")
13. "Invandraren" – 2:42 ("The Immigrant")

== Charts ==
Chart (2001)	Peak position
Swedish Albums (Sverigetopplistan)	1
