= Bob Hund =

Swedish rock band

bob hund

Background information
- Origin: Sweden
- Genres: Indie rock
- Years active: 1991–2025
- Labels: Woah Dad!, Silence Records Adrian Recordings
- Members: Conny Nimmersjö; Johnny Essing; Jonas Jonasson; Mats Hellquist; Thomas Öberg; Christian Gabel
- Past members: Mats Andersson
- Website: bobhund.se

Bob Hund (Swedish for "Bob Dog") is an indie rock band from Sweden. Their music has been described as "what you might expect if you managed to merge Pere Ubu and Pixies with a touch of Kraftwerk". bob hund have performed mostly in Scandinavia as well as in Poland and England. Some of their performances include Roskilde, Hultsfred, Ruisrock and Quart music festivals.

== History ==
Logotype of the band bob hund

bob hund was formed in 1991 by Jonas Jonasson (keyboards) and Thomas Öberg (vocals) after meeting in high school. After six formative months the band's line-up was finished, with Conny Nimmersjö and Johnny Essing on guitar, Mats Hellqvist on bass and Mats Andersson on drums. Legend has it that Essing joined rehearsals to pay off a 100 SEK debt to Hellqvist, and just kept coming back.

The band once stated in an interview that the name bob hund originates from a cartoon dog named Bob Dog in Get a Job, that they once saw while watching television. The dog in question led a very unlucky life.

The band was signed to Silence Records in 1993, and that same year released their debut EP, bob hund. The following year they released their first album, also called bob hund, and won Rock Band of the Year at the Swedish Grammy Awards, Grammisgalan. (They won another Grammis for Best Lyrics in 1996.)

In 1995, after extensive touring, the band went on hiatus as the members worked on new material, which would later make up the foundations for Omslag: Martin Kann (1996) - named after a friend of the band, who've done most of the band's graphics work over the years. The album broke the top 10, but singles I stället för musik, förvirring ("Instead of music, confusion") and Düsseldorf would both fail to break the singles top 10 - peaking at 13 and 28 respectively.

Though exclusively singing in Swedish, they started to gain attention outside of Sweden and Scandinavia. The band claimed in a press release that Graham Coxon - who has voiced his admiration of the band in interviews - asked to play with them, but that the band declined the offer.

bob hund once again toured extensively, and was awarded Live Band of the Year by Swedish tabloid Aftonbladet. In December 1998 Jag rear ut min själ! Allt skall bort!!! ("I'm Selling Off My Soul! Everything Must Go!!!") was released followed by the live album bob hund sover aldrig ("bob hund Never Sleeps").

At the start of the new millennium, equipment worth 115,000 SEK was stolen from their van. During this time, the band members had slowed down the activity of bob hund to concentrate on side projects - among others Bergman Rock, a rock band consisting of all bob hund members, but where Öberg sang in English rather than Swedish. New bob hund material would not surface until single Ska du hänga med? Nä!! ("Are you tagging along? Nah!!") and album Stenåldern kan börja ("Let the Stone Age Begin") was released in early 2001. The album would be the band's first, and as of August 2010 only, to chart at number one.

2002 saw the release of Ingenting ("Nothing"), a compilation album containing old demos from 1992–1993, a limited vinyl pressing of 1000 copies only, single Den lilla planeten ("The Small Planet"). The two CD 10 år tillbaka och 100 år framåt ("10 Years Back and 100 Years Forward") was also released this year. The first disc being a singles compilation, and the second disc contained a live performance recorded in London 2001. During the performance Öberg can be heard explaining, in English, that he'll only speak Swedish to the crowd so they'll know they've paid for the real deal.

After the release of Det där nya som skulle vara så bra ("That New Thing That Was Supposed To Be So Good") the band went on an extended hiatus to concentrate on Bergman Rock and the dance side project Sci-Fi SKANE. The band started touring as bob hund again in late 2006, but would not release any new material until 2008s single Tinnitus i hjärtat ("Tinnitus of the Heart") and album Folkmusik för folk som inte kan bete sig som folk ("Folk music for folk who can't behave like folk").

On 16 June 2009 Christian Gabel officially joined as the seventh member of the band, filling in on drums. In the following year the new lineup released the four-track EP Stumfilm ("Silent Movie").

On 16 March 2011 the group released the album Det överexponerade gömstället ("The Overexposed Hideout"). As a form of commemoration of their 20th anniversary, a second album was released the 15th of February 2012, called Låter som miljarder ("Sounds Like Billions").

On 6 July 2013 the band organized a festival in Folkets Hamn, Helsingborg. At this festival the group would auction off their old instruments and other objects that were left in their old rehearsal studio. The group themselves did not play at this festival, and were instead DJ:ing.

On 12 September 2014 the band premiered a new soundtrack for the silent film Man With a Movie Camera at Cinemateket in Stockholm, with subsequent performances in Helsinki, Luleå, Gothenburg and Malmö.

On 16 September 2016 they released their twelfth studio album, Dödliga Klassiker ("Mortal Classics").

== Discography ==
=== Studio releases ===
- bob hund (1), 1993 (EP)
- bob hund (2), 1994 (Album)
- Omslag: Martin Kann (Cover Art: Martin Kann), 1996 (Album)
- Jag rear ut min själ! Allt skall bort!!! (I'm Selling Out My Soul! Everything Must Go!!!), 1998 (Album)
- sover aldrig (never sleeps), 1999 (Live Album)
- Stenåldern kan börja (The Stone Age May Begin), 2001 (Album)
- Det där nya som skulle vara så bra (That New Thing That Was Supposed To Be So Good), 2003 (Single) - Limited to 500 copies on vinyl
- Bergman Rock, 2003 (Album, as Bergman Rock)
- Bonjour Baberiba Pt II, 2005 (Album, as Bergman Rock)
- Folkmusik för folk som inte kan bete sig som folk (Folk Music for Folk Who Can’t Behave Like Folk), 2009 (Album)
- Stumfilm (Silent Film), 2010 (EP)
- Det överexponerade gömstället (The Overexposed Hideout), 2011 (Album)
- Låter som miljarder (Sounds Like Billions), 2012 (Album)
- #bobhundopera, 2015 (Live Album)
- Dödliga klassiker (Mortal Classics), 2016 (Album)
- 0-100, 2019 (Album)
- BOBHUNDTEATERKONSERT (BOBHUNDTHEATERCONCERT), 2021 (EP)
- Drömmen är en råvara, verkligheten är en raffinerad produkt (Dreams Are a Raw Material, Reality Is a Refined Product), 2023 (Album)

=== Compilations ===
- Ingenting (Nothing), 2002 - Demos from 1992/1993, limited to 1003 copies on vinyl, and made available as free digital downloads on the band's web site
- 10 år bakåt & 100 år framåt (10 Years Back & 100 Years Forward), 2002 - A collection of single and EP tracks, where the second disc contains a live recording from London, 2001.
- Det allra näst bästa (The Very Second Best), 2022 - A collection of previously unreleased studio recordings from the 90's

== Awards ==
- 1994 – Swedish Grammy "Best Live Band"
- 1996 – Swedish Grammy "Best Lyrics"
- 1999 – Guldägget (The Golden Egg) for "Best Packaging" on Jag rear ut min själ! Allt skall bort!!!
