= Eggstone =

Swedish indie pop group

- Origin: Lomma, Sweden
- Genres: Indie Pop
- Years active: 1986–present
- Labels: Snap; Soap; Vibrafon
- Members: Patrik Bartosch; Maurits Carlsson; Per Sunding
- Website: eggstone.com

Eggstone is a Swedish indie pop band, formed in 1986. They have been called the "godfathers of Swedish pop."

== History ==
The three members of Eggstone -- Per Sunding (vocals, bass), Patrik Bartosch (guitar) and Maurits Carlsson (drums) -- were raised in the small coastal town of Lomma, outside Malmö. They founded the band in 1986. In 1991 they formed Tambourine Studios in Malmö with friends Anders Nordgren and producer Tore Johansson. Their debut single, "Bubblebed," was released that year, followed by an EP Shooting Time. Eggstone signed to Snap, and their debut album Eggstone In San Diego was released in 1992. Its single, "Can't Come Close Enough," became a Swedish radio hit.

Two years later, Eggstone released Somersault, produced by Michael Blair. Its single "Water" became a Japanese hit. The band toured Japan twice, and supported The Cardigans for four dates in London. Eggstone split from MNW's Soap label in 1995 and founded the label Vibrafon.

In early 1997, Eggstone released Vive La Différence!, their third full-length album, on Vibrafon. Spanish Slalom, a compilation album, was released on Madrid-based Siesta Records in 1998 and a second compilation appeared in 1999 under the Tricatel label, titled Ça Chauffe en Suède !.

In April 2016 the band made a surprise comeback by releasing "Like So," a recording of a 2002 demo. This was the band's first new music in 19 years. They performed live for the first time in almost two decades on March 4, 2017, with the Malmö Symphony Orchestra. Eggstone's first three albums were later re-released by Denmark label Crunchy Frog.

== Members ==
- Patrik Bartosch - guitar
- Maurits Carlsson - drums
- Per Sunding - bass and vocals

== Discography ==
=== EPs ===
- Bubblebed (1990)
- Shooting Time (1991)
- At Point Loma (1992)
- In Lemon Grove (1992)
- April And May (1997)

=== Albums ===
==== Studio albums ====
- Eggstone in San Diego (1992)
- Somersault (1994)
- Vive La Différence! (1997)

==== Compilations ====
- Spanish Slalom (1998)
- Ça chauffe en Suède ! (1999)

=== Singles ===
- "Water" (1994)
- "Summer And Looking For A Job" (1996)
- "Never Been A Better Day" (1996)
- "Birds In Cages" (1997)
- "Like So" (2016)
- "The Late" (2019)
