= Tambourine Studios =

Recording studio in Malmö, Sweden

Tambourine Studios is a recording studio in the centre of Malmö, Sweden. It was set up by members of the Swedish band Eggstone and has been running since 1991. The studio is best known for its work with the Cardigans, Bob hund, and Saint Etienne.

== History ==
After Tore Johansson recorded Eggstone's 1991 EP Shooting Time, the producer and the band wanted to establish their own project studio. They purchased recording equipment that was being sold by a studio in Kivik and found a location in Malmö for the new studio, which was established that same year by Eggstone band members Per Sunding, Patrik Bartosch, and Maurits Carlsson, along with Johansson and Anders Nordgren.

Following the release of Eggstone's 1992 album, Eggstone in San Diego, the studio began to receive demo tapes sent by other bands. Johansson listened to a demo tape from the Cardigans, and invited the band to the studio to work with him, with the band recording its first three studio albums at Tambourine Studios. Other artists recording at Tambourine Studios included Bob Hund, Envelopes, Cloudberry Jam, Divine Dennis, Green and Lady Lynette as well as international artists such as Saint Etienne, Good shoes and Tom Jones.

== Lawsuits ==
Besides being a recording studio, Tambourine Studios also handled money for several bands and artists. In June 2010 Swedish rapper and singer Timbuktu claimed that 4,9 million Swedish krona had disappeared from his account and been transferred to other artists' companies. Timbuktu sued the active or former companies belonging to the bands The Hives, Europe, The Ark, Weeping Willows and The Soundtrack of Our Lives for 5 million Swedish krona. The Hives responded with counter-suing Timbuktu for 3.2 million Swedish krona. Some of the artists involved in the lawsuits stated that funds were missing and alleged that Tambourine Studios borrowed money from some accounts and lent it to others, all without approval of the involved artists.

In May 2011, Timbuktu recalled his lawsuit against The Hives after they had paid his company 2 million Swedish krona back. Later a settlement was also reached with The Ark. Soon afterward, The Cardigans sued The Hives for 18 million Swedish krona that they meant were lent to The Hives but never returned. The Hives sued Tambourine Studios for 9 million Swedish krona because they felt that Tambourine did not perform the accounting services correctly. In May 2012 The Hives also sued their accountancy firm PWC for 177 million Swedish krona reasoning that the lawsuits had inhibited their creativity. In July 2011 The Ark sued The Hives among others for not repaying their debts.

On 16 April 2013, Lund District Court sentenced The Hives to pay 23.6 million Swedish krona to The Cardigans. In the judgment report, the claims regarding Tambourine Studios making accounting mistakes were dismissed as false.

The conflicts between the different parties escalated into public smear and accusations of crimes in media. An investigation into economic crimes began in 2011, but was later closed because of lack of evidence. On 22 November 2013, Malmö District Court cleared Tambourine Studios completely in the case where they were sued by The Hives for 9 million Swedish krona, dismissing the case in its entirety and sentencing The Hives to pay Tambourine Studios court costs of 4.4 million Swedish krona.
