= Silence Records =

Swedish record label

- Founded: 1970; 56 years ago
- Country of origin: Sweden
- Location: Koppom, Sweden

Silence (Silence Records AB), is a Swedish record company located outside Koppom, Värmland in Sweden.

Silence was started in 1970 in Stockholm and released records by, amongst others: Bo Hansson, Philemon Arthur and the Dung, Samla Mammas Manna, and other progressive rock acts. In 1977, Silence moved to a new studio in Värmland, in a converted school, where artists and bands like Twice a Man, Ebba Grön, Dag Vag, Hellacopters, Eldkvarn, and Kent recorded several albums. Some notable artists currently signed to Silence are Bob Hund, Sci-Fi SKANE, and Fint Tillsammans.

Silence is also one of the larger record labels included in the Svenska oberoende musikproducenter (Swedish independent music producers).

== See also ==
- List of record labels
