= The Cardigans discography =

Swedish rock band discography

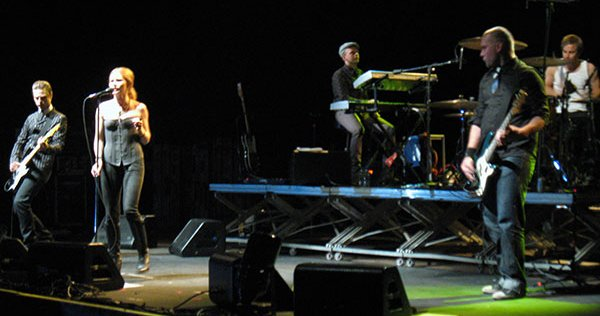
- Studio albums: 6
- Compilation albums: 3
- Singles: 20
- Music videos: 20

The Cardigans are a band from Sweden. They have released six studio albums, which in total have sold about 15 million copies worldwide. This is a list of their album and single releases.

== Studio albums ==
List of studio albums, with selected chart positions, sales figures and certifications
Title	Album details	Peak chart positions										Certifications
Title	Album details	SWE	CAN	DEN	FIN	FRA	GER	JPN	NOR	UK	US	Certifications
Emmerdale	Released: 18 February 1994; Label: Trampolene Records; Formats: CD · cassette	29	—	—	—	—	—	—	—	—	—	GLF: Gold; RIAJ: Gold
Life	Released: 24 March 1995; Label: Stockholm Records; Formats: CD · LP · cassette	20	—	—	—	—	50	13	—	51	—	GLF: Platinum; BPI: Gold; RIAJ: 2× Platinum
First Band on the Moon	Released: 6 September 1996; Label: Stockholm Records; Formats: CD · LP · cassette	2	41	—	16	—	83	4	—	18	35	GLF: Gold; BPI: Gold; MC: Platinum; RIAA: Platinum; RIAJ: 2× Platinum
Gran Turismo	Released: 19 October 1998; Label: Stockholm Records; Formats: CD · LP · Cassette	1	30	2	8	44	38	19	2	8	151	GLF: 2× Platinum; BPI: Platinum; IFPI DEN: Platinum; IFPI NOR: Platinum; RIAJ: Gold; SNEP: Gold
Long Gone Before Daylight	Released: 24 March 2003; Label: Stockholm Records; Formats: CD · LP · cassette	1	—	13	10	47	24	44	8	47	—^{[A]}	GLF: 2× Platinum; IFPI DEN: Gold
Super Extra Gravity	Released: 14 October 2005; Label: Stockholm Records; Formats: CD · digital download	1	—	14	15	85	30	142	8	78	—	GLF: Gold
"—" denotes an album that did not chart or was not released in that territory.

== Compilation albums ==
List of compilation albums with selected chart positions
Title	Album details	Peak chart positions									Certifications
Title	Album details	SWE	BEL	DEN	IRE	JPN	NOR	SPA	SWI	UK	Certifications
The Other Side of the Moon	Released: 5 December 1997; Label: Stockholm Records; Formats: CD	—	—	—	—	44	—	—	—	—	
iTunes Originals	Released: 28 April 2005; Label: Universal Music; Formats: digital download	—	—	—	—	—	—	—	—	—	
Best Of	Released: 30 January 2008; Label: Stockholm Records; Formats: CD · digital download	5	81	8	60	99	5	93	78	32	BPI: Silver
The Rest of the Best – Vol. 1	Released: 6 September 2024; Label: Stockholm Records; Formats: CD · vinyl · digital download	—	—	—	—	—	—	—	—	—	
The Rest of the Best – Vol. 2	Released: 6 September 2024; Label: Stockholm Records; Formats: CD · vinyl · digital download	—	—	—	—	—	—	—	—	—	
"—" denotes an album that was not released in that territory.

== Singles ==
Title	Year	Peak chart positions										Certifications	Album
Title	Year	SWE	AUS	CAN	FRA	GER	IRE	NLD	NZ	UK	US Alt.	Certifications	Album
"Rise and Shine"^{[C]}	1994	—	—	—	—	—	—	—	—	—	—		Emmerdale
"Black Letter Day"^{[D]}	1994	—	—	—	—	—	—	—	—	—	—		Emmerdale
"Sick & Tired"	1994	—	—	—	—	—	—	—	—	96	—		Emmerdale
"Carnival"	1995	—	—	—	—	—	—	44	—	35	—		Life
"Hey! Get Out of My Way"^{[E]}	1995	—	—	—	—	—	—	—	—	—	—		Life
"Sick & Tired" (re-issue)	1995	—	—	—	—	—	—	—	—	34	—		Life
"Rise and Shine" (new version)	1995	—	—	—	—	—	—	—	—	29	—		Life
"Lovefool" (Note: "Lovefool" was later included on Romeo + Juliet OST)	1996	15	11	3	31	6	11	21	1	2	9	ARIA: Gold; BPI: 2× Platinum; RMNZ: 2× Platinum	First Band on the Moon
"Been It"	1996	—	—	—	—	—	—	—	—	56	—		First Band on the Moon
"Your New Cuckoo"	1996	—	—	—	—	—	—	—	—	35	—		First Band on the Moon
"My Favourite Game"	1998	3	61	68	27	90	13	15	36	14	16	GLF: Gold; BPI: Platinum; RMNZ: Gold	Gran Turismo
"Erase/Rewind"	1999	12	—	—	60	71	16	62	36	7	—	BPI: Silver	Gran Turismo
"Hanging Around"	1999	—	—	—	—	—	—	—	—	17	—		Gran Turismo
"Burning Down the House" (with Tom Jones)	1999	2	8	—	21	27	18	58	13	7	—	GLF: Gold; ARIA: Gold; BPI: Silver	Reload
"For What It's Worth"	2003	8	—	—	—	—	37	98	—	31	—		Long Gone Before Daylight
"You're the Storm"	2003	10	—	—	—	—	—	—	—	74	—		Long Gone Before Daylight
"Live and Learn"	2003	—	—	—	—	—	—	—	—	—	—		Long Gone Before Daylight
"I Need Some Fine Wine and You, You Need to Be Nicer"	2005	3	—	—	—	93	—	—	—	59	—		Super Extra Gravity
"Don't Blame Your Daughter (Diamonds)"	2006	49	—	—	—	—	—	—	—	—	—		Super Extra Gravity
"—" denotes a recording that did not chart or was not released in that territory.

== Videography ==
=== Video albums ===
Title	Album details
Life: The True Story	Released: 25 October 1995; Label: PolyGram; Format: VHS, LaserDisc
Live in London	Released: April 1997; Label: PolyGram; Formats: VHS, VCD, LaserDisc, DVD

=== Music videos ===
List of music videos, showing year released and directors
Title	Year	Director(s)
"Rise & Shine"	1994	Bjorn Lindgren
"Black Letter Day"	1994	Bjorn Lindgren
"Sick and Tired"	1994	Bjorn Lindgren
"Carnival"	1995	Bjorn Lindgren
"Rise & Shine" (Japan version)	1995	—N/a
"Lovefool"	1996	Bjorn Lindgren
"Lovefool" (US version)	1996	Geoff Moore
"Been It"	1996	Bjorn Lindgren
"Been It" (US version)	1997	Lawrence Carroll
"Your New Cuckoo"	1997	Quatsi
"My Favourite Game"	1998	Jonas Akerlund
"Erase/Rewind"	1999	Adam Berg
"Hanging Around"	1999	Sophie Muller
"Burning Down the House" (with Tom Jones)	1999	David Mouldy
"Junk of the Hearts" (Nåid Remix)	1999	—N/a
"For What It's Worth"	2003	Amir Chamdin
"You're the Storm"	2003	Amir Chamdin
"Live and Learn"	2003	—N/a
"I Need Some Fine Wine and You, You Need to Be Nicer"	2005	Martin and Bo Johan Renck
"Don't Blame Your Daughter (Diamonds)"	2006	Martin and Bo Johan Renck

== Other appearances ==
- "Lovefool" on William Shakespeare's Romeo + Juliet: Music from the Motion Picture (1996)
- "Carnival" on Original Soundtrack: Austin Powers: International Man of Mystery (1997)
- "War" on A Life Less Ordinary Soundtrack (1997)
- "Deuce" on The X-Files: The Album (1998)
- "War" on 10 Things I Hate About You: Music from the Motion Picture (1999)

== Notes ==
- A Long Gone Before Daylight did not enter the Billboard 200, but peaked at number 37 on Billboard's Independent Albums chart.
- C The original Emmerdale version of "Rise and Shine" was only released in Sweden. It was later re-recorded for international editions of Life. This new version was re-issued as a single in Sweden, Japan and the UK in 1995 and throughout Europe in 1996.
- D "Black Letter Day" was only released in Sweden.
- E "Hey! Get Out of My Way" was only released in Sweden and Japan. In the UK, "Sick and Tired" was re-issued in its place, with the same B-sides.
