= Best Of (The Cardigans album) =

Greatest hits album by the Cardigans
- Released: 25 January 2008
- Recorded: 1993–2005
- Genre: Pop rock
- Label: Stockholm

The Cardigans chronology
Super Extra Gravity (2005)	Best Of (2008)	The Rest of the Best (2024)

Professional ratings
Review scores
Source	Rating
AllMusic	link
Digital Spy	link
NME	Feb 08
Planet Sound	Feb 08
stv.tv	link
Subba Cultcha	9/10 link

Best Of is a greatest hits album by the Swedish group the Cardigans, released in Europe in January 2008. It contains twenty-one singles and album tracks. There is also a double-CD version with rare tracks and B-sides. Both versions of the album contain no new songs, though some tracks had previously been released only in the UK or Japan.

It was released in Canada in May 2008 with a different track listing, containing only sixteen tracks.

== Track listing ==
=== CD 1 ===
No.	Title	Original Album	Length
1.	"Rise and Shine"	Emmerdale (1994)	3:34
2.	"Sick & Tired"	Emmerdale	3:24
3.	"After All..."	Emmerdale	2:56
4.	"Carnival"	Life (1995)	3:37
5.	"Daddy's Car"	Life	3:35
6.	"Lovefool"	First Band on the Moon (1996)	3:21
7.	"Been It" (radio edit)	First Band on the Moon	3:40
8.	"Losers"	First Band on the Moon	3:06
9.	"War"	A Life Less Ordinary soundtrack (1997)	3:57
10.	"My Favourite Game"	Gran Turismo (1998)	3:36
11.	"Erase/Rewind"	Gran Turismo	3:35
12.	"Hanging Around"	Gran Turismo	3:40
13.	"Higher"	Gran Turismo	4:32
14.	"For What It's Worth"	Long Gone Before Daylight (2003)	4:16
15.	"You're the Storm"	Long Gone Before Daylight	3:53
16.	"Live and Learn"	Long Gone Before Daylight	4:16
17.	"Communication"	Long Gone Before Daylight	4:28
18.	"I Need Some Fine Wine and You, You Need to Be Nicer"	Super Extra Gravity (2005)	3:33
19.	"Don't Blame Your Daughter (Diamonds)"	Super Extra Gravity	3:37
20.	"Godspell"	Super Extra Gravity	3:29
21.	"Bonus Track"	Super Extra Gravity	0:22
22.	"Burning Down the House" (duet with Tom Jones)	Reload (1999)	3:40

=== CD 2 ===
No.	Title	Original release	Length
1.	"Pooh Song"	"Sick & Tired" (1994)	3:15
2.	"After All..." (Demo '93)		2:37
3.	"I Figured Out" (Demo '93)		2:07
4.	"Laika"	"Sick & Tired"	1:20
5.	"Plain Parade"	"Sick & Tired"	3:31
6.	"Emmerdale"	"Carnival" (1995)	2:25
7.	"Carnival" (Puck Version)	"Hey! Get Out of My Way" (1995)	2:52
8.	"Happy Meal I"		2:39
9.	"Nasty Sunny Beam"	"Lovefool" (1996)	2:54
10.	"Blah Blah Blah"	"Been It" (1996)	3:00
11.	"Losers" (First Try)	"Been It"	3:16
12.	"Country Hell"	"Your New Cuckoo" (1996)	2:47
13.	"Lovefool" (Puck Version)	"Lovefool"	3:14
14.	"War" (First Try)	The Other Side of the Moon (1997)	4:09
15.	"Deuce"	The X-Files: The Album (1998)	3:32
16.	"The Road"	"For What It's Worth" (2003)	6:52
17.	"Hold Me" (Mini Version)		0:36
18.	"Hold Me"	"You're the Storm" (2003)	3:41
19.	"If There Is a Chance"	"Live and Learn" (2003)	4:16
20.	"For the Boys"	"I Need Some Fine Wine and You, You Need to Be Nicer" (2005)	3:37
21.	"(If You Were) Less Like Me"	"Don't Blame Your Daughter (Diamonds)" (2006)	4:05
22.	"Slowdown Town"	Super Extra Gravity (JP, FR)	4:09
23.	"Give Me Your Eyes"	Super Extra Gravity (UK)	3:23
24.	"Slow"	Super Extra Gravity (UK)	4:03

=== Canadian edition ===
No.	Title	Original Album	Length
1.	"Lovefool"	First Band on the Moon	3:21
2.	"Been It" (radio edit)	First Band on the Moon	3:40
3.	"Carnival"	Life	3:37
4.	"Rise and Shine"	Emmerdale	3:34
5.	"Sick & Tired"	Emmerdale	3:24
6.	"My Favourite Game"	Gran Turismo	3:36
7.	"Erase/Rewind"	Gran Turismo	3:35
8.	"Hanging Around"	Gran Turismo	3:40
9.	"For What It's Worth"	Long Gone Before Daylight	4:16
10.	"You're the Storm"	Long Gone Before Daylight	3:53
11.	"Live and Learn"	Long Gone Before Daylight	4:16
12.	"Communication"	Long Gone Before Daylight	4:28
13.	"I Need Some Fine Wine and You, You Need to Be Nicer"	Super Extra Gravity	3:33
14.	"Don't Blame Your Daughter (Diamonds)"	Super Extra Gravity	3:37
15.	"Burning Down the House"	Reload	3:40
16.	"Godspell"	Super Extra Gravity	3:29

== Charts ==
Chart (2008)	Peak position
Belgian Albums (Ultratop Flanders)	81
Danish Albums (Hitlisten)	8
Irish Albums (IRMA)	60
Norwegian Albums (VG-lista)	5
Spanish Albums (PROMUSICAE)	93
Swedish Albums (Sverigetopplistan)	5
Swiss Albums (Schweizer Hitparade)	78
UK Albums (OCC)	32

== Certifications ==
Region	Certification	Certified units/sales
United Kingdom (BPI)	Silver	60,000^{‡}
^{‡} Sales+streaming figures based on certification alone.

== Release history ==
Country	Date
Netherlands	25 January 2008
Sweden	30 January 2008
Ireland	29 February 2008
Germany	7 March 2008
Canada	6 May 2008
