= The Rest of the Best =

- Vol. 1 cover

Compilation album by the Cardigans
- Released: 6 September 2024
- Label: Universal Music
- Producer: Tore Johansson; The Cardigans; Peter Collins; Gunnar Nordén; Per Sunding; Michael Ilbert

The Cardigans chronology
Best Of (2008)	The Rest of the Best (2024)

Vol. 2 cover

The Rest of the Best is a two-volume compilation by Swedish rock band the Cardigans, released on 6 September 2024. It features 36 tracks, including B-sides, alternate versions, demos and soundtrack features spanning the entire career of the band. The Rest of the Best is the third B-side compilation by the Cardigans, superseding The Other Side of the Moon released in 1997 and the Best Of released in 2008.

== Background ==
We are delighted to release these compilations. Songs that for various reasons were left out of our studio albums. Now our audience can listen through all B sides in chronological order and it’s a pure joy to reminisce all the way back to 1993. It’s almost like a forgotten record, or rather four. We hope you’ll enjoy the 13 year ride!

—The Cardigans

In 2019, the six studio albums of the Cardigans were remastered and in February of that year UMG reissued them on vinyl. The remasters also appeared on streaming platforms. In the following year, the band continued touring and enjoyed a resurgence in popularity due to their song "Step On Me" becoming viral on TikTok.

In February 2024, test pressings of a compilation of the band with the working title The Rest of the Best started appearing on Discogs and were later posted by the band on social media. In July, the compilation was officially announced and made available for pre-order.

The volume was compiled by the Cardigans and remastered by Ryan Smith at Sterling Sound in New York City. The artwork is a collage of photographs of the band taken by Martin Bogren.

== Content ==
The compilation includes B-sides, alternate versions, demos, and soundtrack features, for a total of 36 tracks. The first volume includes 20 tracks recorded between 1993 and 1996, where the second volume includes 16 tracks recorded between 1997 and 2005. It supersedes the band's two previous B-side compilations, The Other Side of the Moon released in Japan and Australia in 1997, and Best Of released in 2008, containing the tracks "The Boys Are Back in Town", "Mr. Crowley", "Iron Man (First Try)", and "Cocktail Party Bloody Cocktail Party", previously only released on the former.

The tracks "Das Model ('00)", "For What It's Worth (Polar Session '01)", "Communication (Polar Session '01)", "You're the Storm (Sandkvie Session)", and "You're the Storm (First Demo)" were previously only available as B-sides or on promo records, whilst the track "Great Divide ('96 Demo)" was previously unreleased.

== Track listing ==
All songs written by Nina Persson and Peter Svensson, except where noted. All songs produced by Tore Johansson, except where noted.

The Rest of the Best – Vol. 1 track listing
No.	Title	Writer(s)	Producer(s)	Length
1.	"Pooh Song"	Mattias Alfheim; Bengt Lagerberg; Persson; Magnus Sveningsson; Svensson		3:13
2.	"I Figured Out" (Demo '93)	Sveningsson; Svensson		2:04
3.	"After All..." (Demo '93)	Sveningsson; Svensson		2:37
4.	"Plain Parade"	Sveningsson; Svensson		3:38
5.	"Laika"	Svensson		1:19
6.	"The Boys Are Back in Town"	Phil Lynott		4:01
7.	"Mr. Crowley" (Recorded live for P3 on June 9, 1994)	Ozzy Osbourne; Randy Rhoads; Bob Daisley	The Cardigans	2:37
8.	"Rise & Shine" (Life Version)	Sveningsson; Svensson		3:32
9.	"Carnival" (Puck Version)	Sveningsson; Persson; Svensson		2:51
10.	"Happy Meal I"	Lynette Koyana; Sveningsson; Svensson		2:37
11.	"Nasty Sunny Beam"			2:56
12.	"Iron Man" (First Try)	Osbourne; Tony Iommi; Geezer Butler; Bill Ward		3:39
13.	"Emmerdale"	Svensson		2:26
14.	"Blah Blah Blah"			3:02
15.	"Losers" (First Try)			3:19
16.	"Lovefool" (Puck Version)		The Cardigans	3:15
17.	"Country Hell"	Sveningsson; Svensson		2:47
18.	"Great Divide" (Demo '96)	Svensson		2:45
19.	"War" (First Try)			4:08
20.	"Cocktail Party Bloody Cocktail Party"	Svensson		15:46
Total length:				72:32

The Rest of the Best – Vol. 2 track listing
No.	Title	Writer(s)	Producer(s)	Length
1.	"War"		Peter Collins	3:56
2.	"Deuce"	Lars-Olof Johansson; Lagerberg; Persson; Svensson		3:33
3.	"Das Model '00"	Karl Bartos; Ralf Hütter; Emil Schult	The Cardigans	2:55
4.	"For What It's Worth" (Polar Session '01)		Gunnar Nordén	4:14
5.	"Communication" (Polar Session '01)		Nordén	4:20
6.	"If There Is a Chance"		Per Sunding; The Cardigans; Johansson^{[a]}	4:13
7.	"Hold Me" (Mini Version)		Sunding; The Cardigans; Johansson^{[a]}	0:34
8.	"Hold Me"		Sunding; The Cardigans; Johansson^{[a]}	3:40
9.	"The Road"		Sunding; The Cardigans; Johansson^{[a]}	6:51
10.	"You're the Storm" (Sandkvie Session)		Sunding; The Cardigans; Johansson^{[a]}	4:32
11.	"You're the Storm" (First Demo)		The Cardigans	3:27
12.	"For the Boys"		Michael Ilbert; The Cardigans	3:37
13.	"(If You Were) Less Like Me"	Persson; Svensson; Nathan Larson	Ilbert; The Cardigans	4:06
14.	"Slowdown Town"			4:06
15.	"Give Me Your Eyes"			3:22
16.	"Slow"	Persson; Svensson; Larson		4:04
Total length:				61:30

Notes

- ^[a] – initial co-production

== Credits and personnel ==
Credits adapted from the album's liner notes.

- Recorded at Tambourine Studios, Malmö (volume 1, tracks 1–6, 8–15, 17–20; volume 2, tracks 2, 6, 7 and 9); Sveriges Radio P3, Stockholm (volume 1, track 7); Room 1026 at the Best Western President Hotel, New York (volume 1, track 16); Sony Music Studios, New York (volume 2, track 1); Country Hell, Malmö (volume 2, track 2); Mr. Tatuago's Nice, Nice Studio, Stockholm (volume 2, tracks 3 and 11); Polar Studios, Stockholm (volume 2, tracks 4 and 5); Sandkvie Studio, Visby (volume 2, tracks 6, 8, 9 and 10); El Cortijo Studio, Benahavis (volume 2, tracks 6, 8 and 9); Parkgate Studio, Catsfield (volume 2, tracks 6, 8 and 9); Maratone Studio, Stockholm (volume 2, tracks 6, 8 and 9); Medley Studios, Copenhagen (volume 2, tracks 12 and 13); Atlantis Studios, Stockholm (volume 2, tracks 12 and 13); Gula Studion, Malmö (volume 2, tracks 14–16).
- Compiled by Peter Svensson, Christer Mellström and The Cardigans

The Cardigans

- The Cardigans – production, mixing and engineering on "You're the Storm" (First Demo), backing vocals on "(If You Were) Less Like Me"
- Nina Persson – vocals
- Peter Svensson – vocals, guitar, bass, keyboards
- Magnus Sveningsson – vocals, bass
- Lars-Olaf Johansson – vocals, keyboards, guitar
- Bengt Lagerberg – vocals, drums, bassoon

Additional musicians

- Ivan Bakran – grand piano on "Cocktail Party Bloody Cocktail Party"
- Jens Lindgård – trombone on "Losers (First Try)"
- Petter Lindgård – trumpet on "Losers (First Try)"
- Eva Landqvist – backing vocals on "(If You Were) Less Like Me"
- Lynette Koyana – backing vocals on "Happy Meal I"
- Anders Nordgren – flute on "Pooh Song"

Technical personnel

- Karl Berger – string arrangement on "War"
- Martin Bogren – photography
- Karl-Magnus Boske – art direction and design
- David Carlsson – engineering on "Slowdown Town", "Give Me Your Eyes" and "Slow"
- Maurits Carlsson – mixing on "Hold Me", "The Road", "You're the Storm (Sandkvie Session)" at Tambourine Studios
- Jim Caruana – assistant engineer on "War"
- Peter Collins – production on "War"
- John Holbrook – engineering and mixing on "War"
- Michael Ilbert – production and mixing at Megaphon Studios, Stockholm on "If There Is a Chance", "Hold Me (Mini Version)"
- Tore Johansson – production, engineering, mixing; initial co-production on "If There Is a Chance", "Hold Me" (Mini Version), "Hold Me", "The Road" and "You're the Storm" (Sandkvie Session)
- Nathan Larson – vocal co-production and engineering "If There Is a Chance", "Hold Me", "The Road" and "You're the Storm" (Sandkvie Session); vocal co-production on "For the Boys" and "(If You Were) Less Like Me"; additional engineering on "Slowdown Town", "Give Me Your Eyes" and "Slow"
- Jens Langård – engineering on "Slowdown Town", "Give Me Your Eyes" and "Slow"
- Marco Manieri – engineering on "Slowdown Town", "Give Me Your Eyes" and "Slow"
- Gunnar Nordén – production on "For What It's Worth" and "Communication" (Polar Sessions)
- Lennart Östlund – mixing and engineering on "For What It's Worth" and "Communication" (Polar Sessions)
- Herman Söderström – additional engineering on "If There Is a Chance", "Hold Me" (Mini Version), "Hold Me" and "The Road"
- Ryan Smith – mastering (at Sterling Sound)
- Per Sunding – additional backing vocals ("If There Is a Chance"); production on "If There Is a Chance", "Hold Me" (Mini Version), "Hold Me" and "The Road"
