= Brainpool =

Brainpool may refer to:

- Brainpool TV, a German television production company
- Brainpool (band), a Swedish pop group
- ECC Brainpool, standard curves in elliptic curve cryptography
