= Hanging Around (The Cardigans song) =

- CD1 Cover

Single by the Cardigans

from the album Gran Turismo
- B-side: "Remixes"
- Released: 12 July 1999
- Length: 3:40
- Label: Stockholm; Polydor
- Songwriters: Peter Svensson; Nina Persson
- Producer: Tore Johansson

The Cardigans singles chronology
"Erase/Rewind" (1998)	"Hanging Around" (1999)	"Burning Down the House" (1999)

Alternative Cover
- CD Single part 2

"Hanging Around" is a song written by Peter Svensson and Nina Persson for the Cardigans' 1998 album Gran Turismo. The song is the album's fifth track, and was released as its third single on 12 July 1999, and charted at number 17 on the UK Singles Chart. The music video was directed by Sophie Muller, and is based on the 1965 Roman Polanski film, Repulsion, with Nina Persson playing the role of 'Carol'.

== Track listing ==
UK Maxi Single

1. Hanging Around (Alternative Radio Mix) - 3:41
2. My Favourite Game (Rollo's Mix) - 6:37
3. Hanging Around (Nåid Remix) -4:10)
4. Hanging Around (CD-Rom Video) - 3:41

Alternate Maxi Single

1. Hanging Around (Radio Version) - 3:43
2. Hanging Around (Jasmine St. Claire Mix) - 4:49
3. Hanging Around (Nåid Remix) - 4:10
4. Erase / Rewind (Director's Cut Video) - 3:35

== Credits and personnel ==
- Vocals: Nina Persson
- Guitar: Peter Svensson
- Bass: Magnus Sveningsson
- Guitar: Lars-Olof Johansson
- Drums: Bengt Lagerberg
- Recorded at Country Hell, Tambourine Studios, Skurup, Sweden
- Producer: Tore Johansson
- Engineer: Tore Johansson, Janne Waldenmark
- Assistant engineer: Lars Göransson
- Audio mixing: Tore Johansson
- Mixing assistant: Jim Caruana
- Mastering by: Björn Engelmann

== Charts ==
Weekly chart performance for "Hanging Around"
Chart (1999)	Peak position
Scottish Singles Sales (Official Charts)	19
UK Singles (Official Charts)	17

Annual chart rankings for "Hanging Around"
Chart (1999)	Rank
European Airplay (Border Breakers)	60
