= Super Extra Gravity =

Studio album by the Cardigans
- Released: 14 October 2005
- Recorded: 2005
- Genre: Rock; country rock; pop rock
- Length: 40:03
- Label: Stockholm
- Producer: Tore Johansson

The Cardigans chronology
Long Gone Before Daylight (2003)	Super Extra Gravity (2005)	Best Of (2008)

Singles from Super Extra Gravity
- 1. "I Need Some Fine Wine and You, You Need to Be Nicer" Released: 21 September 2005; 2. "Don't Blame Your Daughter (Diamonds)" Released: 6 February 2006

Professional ratings
Aggregate scores
Source	Rating
Metacritic	64/100
Review scores
Source	Rating
AllMusic	3/5 stars
Dotmusic	7/10
Mojo	3/5 stars
Pitchfork	7.5/10
PopMatters	7/10
Rolling Stone	3/5 stars
Slant Magazine	3.5/5 stars
Spin	4/10
Under the Radar	8/10
URB	4/5 stars

Super Extra Gravity is the sixth and final studio album by Swedish rock band the Cardigans. It was produced by Tore Johansson, who last worked with the Cardigans on Gran Turismo and later with the band Franz Ferdinand. The album was released in Germany and Ireland on 14 October 2005 and in the UK on 17 October 2005. A Japanese edition was later released. The first single released was "I Need Some Fine Wine and You, You Need to Be Nicer". The second single was "Don't Blame Your Daughter (Diamonds)". It was said that "Godspell"—the lyrics of which reference a conservative religious mentality common to the band's hometown of Jönköping—was to be the third single, but plans for its release fell through.

== Singles ==
1. "I Need Some Fine Wine and You, You Need to Be Nicer" (8 October 2005)
2. "Don't Blame Your Daughter (Diamonds)" (6 February 2006)
- The band planned to release "Don't Blame Your Daughter (Diamonds)" in the UK in April 2006, but this was cancelled because of the poor performance of the album and first single there. Instead, a two-track digital single was released on iTunes in the UK.
- Promos were sent to radio in Europe for "Godspell" as a third single from the album, but a full commercial release never happened.

== Track listing ==
All music by Peter Svensson; all lyrics by Nina Persson and Nathan Larson, except where noted.

1. "Losing a Friend" (Persson) – 3:44
2. "Godspell" – 3:29
3. "Drip Drop Teardrop" (Persson) – 3:15
4. "Overload" – 3:18
5. "I Need Some Fine Wine and You, You Need to Be Nicer" – 3:33
6. "Don't Blame Your Daughter (Diamonds)" – 3:37
7. "Little Black Cloud" (Persson) – 3:26
8. "In the Round" – 4:17
9. "Holy Love" – 4:07
10. "Good Morning Joan" – 3:37
11. "And Then You Kissed Me II" – 4:01

=== Japanese and French editions bonus tracks ===
12. "Bonus Track" – 0:22
13. "Slowdown Town" – 4:09

=== UK edition bonus tracks ===
12. "Bonus Tracks" – 0:22
13. "Give Me Your Eyes" (Persson) – 3:23
14. "Slow" – 4:03

"Godspell" German promotional single cover

== Personnel ==
- Peter Svensson – guitar, vocals
- Magnus Sveningsson – bass, vocals
- Bengt Lagerberg – drums, percussion
- Lars-Olof Johansson – keyboards, piano
- Nina Persson – lead vocals

== Charts ==
=== Weekly charts ===
Weekly chart performance for Super Extra Gravity
Chart (2005)	Peak position
Austrian Albums (Ö3 Austria)	48
Danish Albums (Hitlisten)	14
Finnish Albums (Suomen virallinen lista)	15
French Albums (SNEP)	85
German Albums (Offizielle Top 100)	30
Japanese Albums (Oricon)	142
Norwegian Albums (VG-lista)	8
Swedish Albums (Sverigetopplistan)	1
Swiss Albums (Schweizer Hitparade)	42
UK Albums (OCC)	78

=== Year-end charts ===
Year-end chart performance for Super Extra Gravity
Chart (2005)	Position
Swedish Albums (Sverigetopplistan)	23
Chart (2006)	Position
Swedish Albums (Sverigetopplistan)	83

== Certifications ==
Certifications for Super Extra Gravity
Region	Certification	Certified units/sales
Sweden (GLF)	Gold	30,000^{^}
^{^} Shipments figures based on certification alone.
