= I Need Some Fine Wine and You, You Need to Be Nicer =

2005 single by the Cardigans

- CD single cover

Single by the Cardigans

from the album Super Extra Gravity
- B-side: "For the Boys"
- Released: 28 September 2005
- Length: 3:33
- Label: Universal; Stockholm
- Songwriters: Peter Svensson; Nina Persson; Nathan Larson
- Producer: Tore Johansson

The Cardigans singles chronology
"Live and Learn" (2003)	"I Need Some Fine Wine and You, You Need to Be Nicer" (2005)	"Don't Blame Your Daughter (Diamonds)" (2006)

Music video
- "I Need Some Fine Wine and You, You Need to Be Nicer" on YouTube

"I Need Some Fine Wine and You, You Need to Be Nicer" is the first single from Swedish rock band the Cardigans' sixth album, Super Extra Gravity (2005). The single was released in September 2005 and includes the B-side "For the Boys", which was previously released as the bonus track on the American release of their fifth album, Long Gone Before Daylight (2003), as well as "Explode" and "My Favourite Game", which were recorded live at the Kyiv Sporthall in December 2003.

The single was successful in Sweden, where it debuted and peaked at number three on 6 October 2005, but it was not commercially successful elsewhere, failing to reach the top 50 in Germany and the United Kingdom. The song's music video was directed by Martin Renck and Jakob Ström.

== Track listings ==
- Scandinavian CD single
1. "I Need Some Fine Wine and You, You Need to Be Nicer" – 3:33
2. "For the Boys" – 3:37
- European CD single
1. "I Need Some Fine Wine and You, You Need to Be Nicer" – 3:33
2. "Explode" (live in Kyiv) – 3:37
3. "My Favourite Game" (live in Kyiv) – 5:48
- European 7-inch single

A. "I Need Some Fine Wine and You, You Need to Be Nicer" – 3:33
B. "Explode" (live in Kyiv) – 4:34

== Charts ==
=== Weekly charts ===
Chart (2005)	Peak position
Germany (GfK)	93
Scotland Singles (OCC)	51
Sweden (Sverigetopplistan)	3
UK Singles (OCC)	59

=== Year-end charts ===
Chart (2005)	Position
Sweden (Hitlistan)	62

== Release history ==
Region	Date	Format(s)	Label(s)	Ref.
Scandinavia	28 September 2005	CD	Universal; Stockholm	
United Kingdom	3 October 2005	CD	Universal; Stockholm	
