= Righteous Boy =

I Sing Because of You

Studio album by Righteous Boy
- Released: 2002
- Recorded: Tambourine Studios, with additional material recorded at L.A.B. Studios
- Genre: Indie/alternative
- Length: 46:49
- Label: Future Farmer Recordings
- Producer: Batti, Henrik Andersson, Righteous Boy

Righteous Boy is the solo project of Magnus Sveningsson, bassist from Swedish rock group The Cardigans. Sveningsson began the project during the long hiatus between the Cardigans' Gran Turismo and Long Gone Before Daylight albums. To date, Righteous Boy's single album release is I Sing Because of You (2003), which contained the single "Loved Among Friends."

== I Sing Because of You ==
I Sing Because of You was recorded at Tambourine Studios (Malmö, Sweden) and mastered by Björn Engelmann at Cutting Room Studios.

=== Track listing ===
1. "Loved Among Friends" (3:45)
2. "View from a Satellite" (4:25)
3. "No More Love" (3:57)
4. "Righteous Boy / Righteous Girl" (4:04)
5. "I Made It Hard for You to Love Me" (3:34)
6. "All My Evils" (4:11)
7. "I'm Not Shielded" (1:10)
8. "Elephant Man" (4:35)
9. "I Feel Apart" (4:00)
10. "Lone Among Friends" (4:13)
11. "Straight Song" (4:06)
12. "You Better Do Good" (4:49)

=== Personnel ===
- Magnus Sveningsson: co-producer, writer, vocals, bass (tracks: 3, 4, 5, 6, 8, 9, 10, 12), organ (8, 9, 10, 12), vibraphone (6, 9, 10, 11), melodica (9, 10), keyboards (2, 6) and drums (3, 4)
- Henrik Andersson: producer, mastering, co-writer (1, 3, 4), bass (1), guitar (1, 3, 4, 6), backing vocals (1, 6, 8, 10), keyboards (1, 3, 4, 5, 9), piano (3, 5), violin (3)
- Sebastian "Batti" Borg, of stockfinster: co-producer, guitar (2, 3, 6, 8, 10, 11, 12), synthesizer (8, 11, 12), organ (9), mandolin (2).
- Michael Ilbert: mixing (tracks 1,2 and 5 to 12), horn arrangements (12)
- Marco Manieri: mixing (3, 4)
- Jens Jansson, of Brainpool: drums (1, 2, 5, 6, 8, 10, 11, 12), horns (12)
- Patrik Barstosch, of Eggstone: piano (1, 2, 10), synthesizer (3), organ (11)
- Nathan Larson: programming (3, 4), backing vocals (5, 9)
- Stefan Kvarnström: programming (8, 9)
- Petter Lindgård, of Gula Studion and The Mopeds: trumpet (2), horns (12)
- Per Sunding, of Eggstone: recording of additional vocals (2, 6), bass (11)
- Filip Runeson: cello and violin (5)
- Helena Josefsson, of Sandy Mouche: backing vocals (2, 4, 11, 12)
- Lina Johansson: backing vocals (3)
- Claes Persson: co-writer (track 2)
- Juanjo Passo: voice (8)
- Åbäke: graphic design
