= Your New Cuckoo =

1997 single by the Cardigans

Single by the Cardigans

from the album First Band on the Moon
- B-side: "Country Hell"
- Released: 9 December 1996
- Studio: Tambourine (Malmö, Sweden)
- Length: 4:05
- Label: Stockholm
- Songwriters: Peter Svensson; Nina Persson
- Producer: Tore Johansson

The Cardigans singles chronology
| "Been It" (1996) | "Your New Cuckoo" (1996) | "My Favourite Game" (1998) |

Alternate cover
- CD2

"Your New Cuckoo" is a song from Swedish band the Cardigans' third studio album, First Band on the Moon. Released on 9 December 1996, the song reached number 35 on the UK Singles Chart the following year.

== Formats and track listings ==
"Your New Cuckoo", "Lovefool", and "Hey! Get Out of My Way" were written by Nina Persson and Peter Svensson; "Country Hell", "I Figured Out", "After All", "Rise and Shine", and "Sick and Tired" were written by Magnus Sveningsson and Svensson; "Carnival" was written by Persson, Sveningsson, and Svensson.

- Swedish 12-inch vinyl

A1. "Your New Cuckoo" (Hyper Disco Mix)
B1. "Your New Cuckoo" (Super Stereo Mix)
B2. "Your New Cuckoo" (radio edit)

- European CD single
1. "Your New Cuckoo" (radio edit) – 3:30
2. "Country Hell" – 2:45
- European maxi-CD single
1. "Your New Cuckoo" (radio edit) – 3:30
2. "Country Hell" – 2:45
3. "I Figured Out" (demo '93) – 2:04
4. "After All" (demo '93) – 2:36
- UK CD1
1. "Your New Cuckoo" (radio edit) – 3:30
2. "Your New Cuckoo" (Hyper Disco Mix) – 9:24
3. "Your New Cuckoo" (Super Stereo Mix) – 3:52
- UK CD2
1. "Your New Cuckoo" (radio edit) – 3:30
2. "I Figured Out" (demo '93) – 2:04
3. "After All" (demo '93) – 2:36
4. "Lovefool" (radio edit) – 3:17
- Australian CD single
1. "Your New Cuckoo" (radio edit) – 3:30
2. "Your New Cuckoo" (Hyper Disco Mix) – 9:24
3. "Your New Cuckoo" (Super Stereo Mix) – 3:52
4. "Country Hell" – 2:47
- Japanese limited-edition 7-inch EP (Stockholm: POKP–9001)

A1. "Your New Cuckoo"
A2. "Carnival"
B1. "Rise and Shine"
B2. "Hey! Get Out of My Way"
B3. "Sick & Tired"

== Credits and personnel ==
Credits are adapted from the liner notes of First Band on the Moon.

Musicians

- Nina Persson – lead vocals
- Peter Svensson – guitar
- Magnus Sveningsson – bass
- Lars-Olof Johansson – keyboards
- Bengt Lagerberg – drums and percussion

Additional musicians and technical personnel

- Åsa Håkansson – violin
- Maria Holm – violin
- Tore Johansson – engineering and production
- Roger Jonsson – mastering
- Lynette Koyana – backing vocals
- Mattias Svensson – violin
- David Wilczewski – flute
- Inga Zeppezauer – violin

== Charts ==
| Chart (1997) | Peak position |
|---|---|
| Scotland (OCC) | 30 |
| UK Singles (OCC) | 35 |

== Release history ==
| Region | Date | Format(s) | Label(s) | Ref. |
|---|---|---|---|---|
| Japan | 9 December 1996 | CD | Polydor; Trampolene | |
| United Kingdom | 25 August 1997 | CD; cassette | Polydor; Stockholm; Trampolene | |
