= Burning Down the House =

1983 single by Talking Heads

- Standard cover art

Single by Talking Heads

from the album Speaking in Tongues
- B-side: "I Get Wild / Wild Gravity"
- Released: July 1983
- Genre: New wave; funk; art rock
- Length: 4:00
- Label: Sire
- Composers: David Byrne; Chris Frantz; Jerry Harrison; Tina Weymouth
- Lyricist: David Byrne
- Producer: Talking Heads

Talking Heads singles chronology
"Life During Wartime" (live) (1982)	"Burning Down the House" (1983)	"This Must Be the Place (Naive Melody)" (1983)

Music video
- "Burning Down the House" on YouTube

"Burning Down the House" is a song by the American rock band Talking Heads, released in July 1983 by Sire Records as the first single from their fifth studio album Speaking in Tongues. The song became their only top-10 single on the US Billboard Hot 100, peaking at No. 9.

== Inspiration and composition ==
"Burning Down the House" is a new wave, funk, and art rock song. "This song started from a jam," says bassist Tina Weymouth in the liner notes of Once in a Lifetime: The Best of Talking Heads (1992). "Chris [Frantz] had just been to see Parliament-Funkadelic in its full glory at Madison Square Garden, and he was really hyped. During the jam, he kept yelling 'Burn down the house!' which was a P-Funk audience chant, and David [Byrne] dug the line, changing it to the finished version, 'Burning down the house'." (Note: Bernie Worrell of Parliament-Funkadelic joined Talking Heads' live incarnation.) Byrne began writing the lyrics in 1982, and felt the song's title served as a metaphor for liberation of one's self, adding that he did not intend to tell a cohesive narrative with his lyrics but rather gather various "aphorisms and nonsequiturs that had an emotional connection."

The initial lyrics were considerably different, however. In an interview on NPR's All Things Considered aired on December 2, 1984, David Byrne played excerpts of early worktapes showing how the song had evolved from an instrumental jam by Weymouth and Frantz. Once the whole band had reworked the groove into something resembling the final recording, Byrne began chanting and singing nonsense syllables over the music until he arrived at phrasing that fit with the rhythms—a technique influenced by former Talking Heads producer Brian Eno: "and then I [would] just write words to fit that phrasing ... I'd have loads and loads of phrases collected that I thought thematically had something to do with one another, and I'd pick from those."

According to Byrne in the NPR interview, phrases that he tried but ultimately did not use in the song included "I have another body", "Pick it up by the handle", "You travel with a double", and "I'm still under construction". As for the title phrase in the chorus, one early attempt (as heard on a worktape) had him singing a different line, "What are we gonna do?", and at another point in the process, "instead of chanting 'Burning Down the House,' I was chanting 'Foam Rubber, USA.'"

== Music video ==
The video, produced and directed by Byrne, alternates primarily between footage of the band performing the song in an empty ballroom, Byrne playing while facing a projection screen that displays a concert crowd or a wall of flames at different times, and images projected on the outside wall of a house. A young boy resembling Byrne takes his place from time to time; eventually, younger counterparts start moving the arms of all four band members to play the music. After the screen goes blank, both young and adult Byrne leave the stage, and the video ends with an extended close-up of Byrne's face projected on a highway at night.

The house used in the video is located on Myrtle Street in Union Township, New Jersey. Max Illidge (credited as Max Loving), vocalist of the band 40 Below Summer, and Rockets Redglare appear as the younger selves of Byrne and Jerry Harrison, respectively.

== Chart performance ==
"Burning Down the House" was Talking Heads' highest-charting hit single in North America, becoming their only top ten single on the US Billboard Hot 100, peaking at No. 9, as well as reaching the top ten in the Canadian Singles Chart. Despite this success, the song was not a hit outside of North America. In Australia it peaked at a modest No. 94, while in the UK, where Talking Heads would release 14 charting singles, it failed to chart.

A year later, an extended live version of the song is a highlight of the band's landmark concert film Stop Making Sense (1984). In September 2023, commemorating the film's 40th anniversary, a remastered version was released across America in IMAX theaters, and later in conventional theaters worldwide.

== Track listings ==
7-inch single

A. "Burning Down the House" – 4:00
B. "I Get Wild/Wild Gravity" – 4:06

UK 12-inch single

A1. "Burning Down the House" (album version)
A2. "I Get Wild/Wild Gravity" (cassette version)
B1. "Moon Rocks" (cassette version)

== Personnel ==
Credits adapted from the Once in a Lifetime: The Best of Talking Heads liner notes.

Talking Heads

- David Byrne – lead vocals; guitars; bass; keyboards; percussion
- Jerry Harrison – keyboards; guitar; backing vocals
- Tina Weymouth – synth bass
- Chris Frantz – drums; backing vocals; synthesizer

Additional personnel

- Wally Badarou – synthesizers
- Steve Scales – percussion

== Charts ==
=== Weekly charts ===
Chart (1983–1984)	Peak position
Australian Singles Chart	94
Canada Top Singles (RPM)	8
Flemish Singles Chart	40
New Zealand Singles Chart	5
US Billboard Hot 100	9
US Rock Top Tracks (Billboard)	6
US Cash Box Top 100	10

=== Year-end charts ===
Chart (1983)	Position
Canada Top Singles (RPM)	70

== Certifications ==
Region	Certification	Certified units/sales
New Zealand (RMNZ)	Platinum	30,000^{‡}
United Kingdom (BPI)	Silver	200,000^{‡}
^{‡} Sales+streaming figures based on certification alone.

== Tom Jones and the Cardigans version ==
"Burning Down the House"

Single by Tom Jones and the Cardigans

from the album Reload
- B-side: "Unbelievable" (live); "Come Together" (live)
- Released: September 13, 1999
- Studio: Tambourine (Malmö, Sweden)
- Genre: Dance-rock
- Length: 3:40
- Label: Gut; V2
- Songwriters: David Byrne; Tina Weymouth; Chris Frantz; Jerry Harrison
- Producer: Tore Johansson

Tom Jones singles chronology
"You Can Leave Your Hat On" (1997)	"Burning Down the House" (1999)	"Baby, It's Cold Outside" (1999)

The Cardigans singles chronology
"Hanging Around" (1999)	"Burning Down the House" (1999)	"For What It's Worth" (2003)

Music video
- "Burning Down the House" on YouTube

Welsh singer Tom Jones recorded a version of "Burning Down the House" with Swedish rock band the Cardigans for his collaborations album Reload (1999). In common with the other tracks on the album, the recording was made with the collaborators' choice of producer and studio, in this case Tore Johansson and Tambourine Studios in Malmö, Sweden.

The track was released as the lead single from Reload on September 13, 1999, and became a hit across Europe and Australia, reaching No. 1 in Iceland, No. 2 in Sweden, and the top ten in Australia, Denmark, Finland, Hungary, Norway and the United Kingdom. The single was backed with Jones' live recordings of the EMF song "Unbelievable" and the Beatles' "Come Together", as well as remixes of "Burning Down the House" by Delakota, Pepe Deluxé and DJ Scissorkicks.

As one of the major hits of Jones' later career, it appears on numerous compilations of Jones' work. It also features on the Cardigans' 2008 Best Of album.

=== Track listings ===
UK CD1; Australian CD2; Japanese CD single

1. "Burning Down the House"
2. "Burning Down the House" (Delakota mix)
3. "Burning Down the House" (Pepe Deluxé mix)
4. "Burning Down the House" (DJ Scissorkicks instrumental mix)

UK CD2

1. "Burning Down the House"
2. "Unbelievable" (Tom Jones live)
3. "Come Together" (Tom Jones live)

UK cassette single

1. "Burning Down the House"
2. "Burning Down the House" (Delakota mix)
3. "Burning Down the House" (Pepe Deluxé mix)

European CD single

1. "Burning Down the House" (album version) – 3:38
2. "Come Together" (Tom Jones live) – 4:14

European maxi-CD single

1. "Burning Down the House" (album version) – 3:38
2. "Unbelievable" (Tom Jones live) – 4:10
3. "Come Together" (Tom Jones live) – 4:12
4. "Burning Down the House" (Delakota mix) – 5:00
5. "Burning Down the House" (Pepe Deluxé mix) – 4:10

Australian CD1

1. "Burning Down the House"
2. "Burning Down the House" (Delakota mix)
3. "Burning Down the House" (Pepe Deluxé mix)
4. "Burning Down the House" (DJ Scissorkicks instrumental mix)
5. "Unbelievable" (Tom Jones live)
6. "Come Together" (Tom Jones live)

=== Credits and personnel ===
Credits are adapted from the Reload album booklet.

Studio

- Recorded at Tambourine Studios (Malmö, Sweden)
- Mastered at The Soundmasters (London, England)

Personnel

- Tom Jones – vocals
- Nina Persson – vocals
- Tore Johansson – backing vocals; additional keyboards; production
- Lynette Koyana – backing vocals
- Per Sunding – backing vocals
- Patrik Bartosch – backing vocals
- Maurits Carlsson – backing vocals
- Peter Svensson – guitar
- Lasse Johansson – guitar; keyboards
- Pece Masalkovski – additional guitars
- Magnus Sveningsson – bass
- Bengt Lagerberg – drums
- Jens Lindgård – horns
- Petter Lindgård – horns
- Sven Andersson – horns
- Hello Bobadee – horn arrangement
- Kevin Metcalf – mastering

=== Charts ===
==== Weekly charts ====
Chart (1999)	Peak position
Australia (ARIA)	8
Austria (Ö3 Austria Top 40)	21
Belgium (Ultratip Bubbling Under Flanders)	2
Denmark (IFPI)	6
Europe (Eurochart Hot 100)	15
Finland (Suomen virallinen lista)	10
France (SNEP)	21
Germany (GfK)	27
Hungary (Mahasz)	5
Iceland (Íslenski Listinn Topp 40)	1
Ireland (IRMA)	18
Netherlands (Dutch Top 40 Tipparade)	7
Netherlands (Single Top 100)	58
New Zealand (Recorded Music NZ)	13
Norway (VG-lista)	4
Scottish Singles Sales (Official Charts)	5
Sweden (Sverigetopplistan)	2
Switzerland (Schweizer Hitparade)	31
UK Singles (Official Charts)	7
UK Indie (Official Charts)	2

==== Year-end charts ====
Chart (1999)	Position
Australia (ARIA)	82
Europe (Eurochart Hot 100)	95
New Zealand (RIANZ)	26
Sweden (Hitlistan)	45
UK Singles (OCC)	136

=== Certifications ===
Region	Certification	Certified units/sales
Australia (ARIA)	Gold	35,000^{^}
Sweden (GLF)	Gold	15,000^{^}
United Kingdom (BPI)	Silver	200,000^{‡}
^{^} Shipments figures based on certification alone.^{‡} Sales+streaming figures based on certification alone.

== Paramore version ==
"Burning Down the House"

Single by Paramore

from the album Everyone's Getting Involved: A Tribute to Talking Heads' Stop Making Sense
- A-side: "Hard Times"
- Released: January 31, 2024
- Studio: Henson (Los Angeles)
- Length: 3:38
- Label: A24
- Songwriters: David Byrne; Tina Weymouth; Chris Frantz; Jerry Harrison
- Producer: Carlos de la Garza

Paramore singles chronology
"Running Out of Time" (2023)	"Burning Down the House" (2024)

Visualizer video
- "Burning Down the House" on YouTube

In early 2024, A24 announced Everyone's Getting Involved, a tribute album to the Talking Heads concert film Stop Making Sense. On January 31, American rock band Paramore released a cover version of "Burning Down the House" as the album's lead single.

The version received praise from David Byrne, who later that year covered Paramore's own Talking Heads-inspired 2017 track "Hard Times". On April 19, 2024, both covers were released as B-side and A-side respectively of a twelve-inch single for Record Store Day 2024, which Paramore served as ambassadors for.

The band regularly performed the cover during their stint as a supporting act for Taylor Swift's The Eras Tour later that year. They also performed it during their set at the 2024 iHeartRadio Music Festival.

=== Personnel ===
Musicians

- Hayley Williams – lead vocals
- Zac Farro – drums
- Taylor York – guitars
- Joey Mullen – percussion
- Brian Robert Jones – guitars; backing vocals
- Joey Howard – bass guitar; backing vocals
- Logan McKenzie – keyboards
- Kayla Graninger – backing vocals
- Gavin McDonald – backing vocals
- Reggie Watts – backing vocals
- Pam Autori – backing vocals

Additional personnel

- Carlos de la Garza – production, engineering, mixing
- Harriet Tam – engineering
- Mark Aguilar – engineering
- Joe LaPorta – mastering

=== Charts ===
Chart (2024)	Peak position
US Hot Rock & Alternative Songs (Billboard)	46

== Other versions ==
A number of musical acts have covered the song in their live performances, including Bonnie Raitt and John Legend. In 2009, the Used recorded a rendition of the song that was heard in the soundtrack of the film Transformers: Revenge of the Fallen. Olivia Rodrigo performed the song live with David Byrne during her set at the 2025 edition of the Governors Ball.

Dave Matthews Band has covered the song numerous times, and released their cover on multiple live albums. The band covered the song again for the encore at the 2024 Rock and Roll Hall of Fame induction ceremony.
