= The Other Side of the Moon (album) =

Compilation album by the Cardigans
- Released: 5 December 1997
- Recorded: 1994–1997
- Genres: Pop rock, alternative rock, indie pop
- Length: 57:36
- Label: Stockholm

The Cardigans chronology
First Band on the Moon (1996)	The Other Side of the Moon (1997)	Gran Turismo (1998)

Professional ratings
Review scores
Source	Rating
AllMusic	4/5 stars

The Other Side of the Moon is a compilation album by the Cardigans. It features B-sides and rarities that never made it onto the albums, and were previously only available on singles. It was released only in Japan and Australia on 5 December 1997. The songs were later released on the compilation album The Rest of the Best.

== Track listing ==
1. "War (First Try)" (Nina Persson, Peter Svensson) – 4:09 [previously unreleased]
2. "I Figured Out" (Magnus Sveningsson, Svensson) – 2:05 [from the single "Black Letter Day"]
3. "Plain Parade" (Sveningsson, Svensson) – 3:31 [from the single "Sick And Tired"]
4. "Laika" (Svensson) – 1:20 [from the single "Sick And Tired"]
5. "Pooh Song" (Alfheim, Lagerberg, Persson, Sveningsson, Svensson) – 3:15 [from the single "Sick And Tired"]
6. "Mr. Crowley" (Ozzy Osbourne) – 2:35 [from the single "Carnival"]
7. "Emmerdale" (Svensson) – 2:25 [from the single "Carnival"]
8. "The Boys Are Back in Town" (Phil Lynott) – 4:04 [from the single "Hey! Get Out of My Way"]
9. "Carnival (Puck Version)" (Persson, Sveningsson, Svensson) – 2:52 [from the single "Hey! Get Out of My Way"]
10. "Nasty Sunny Beam" (Persson, Svensson) – 2:54 [from the single "Lovefool"]
11. "Iron Man (First Try)" (Geezer Butler, Tony Iommi, Osbourne, Bill Ward) – 3:39 [from the single "Lovefool"]
12. "Blah Blah Blah" (Persson, Svensson) – 3:00 [from the single "Been It"]
13. "Losers (First Try)" (Persson, Svensson) – 3:16 [from the single "Been It"]
14. "Country Hell" (Sveningsson, Svensson) – 2:47 [from the single "Your New Cuckoo"]
15. "After All" (Sveningsson, Svensson) – 2:37 [from the single "Rise And Shine"]
16. "Cocktail Party Bloody Cocktail Party" (Svensson) – 15:47 (a medley of songs from Life) [from the single "Rise And Shine" (re-release)]

== Charts ==
Chart (1997)	Peak; position
Japanese Albums (Oricon)	44
