= First Band on the Moon =

Studio album by the Cardigans
- Released: 6 September 1996
- Recorded: September 1995 – June 1996
- Studios: Tambourine Studios (Malmö, Sweden)
- Genres: Pop rock; power pop; indie pop; electropop
- Length: 39:01
- Labels: Stockholm; Mercury
- Producer: Tore Johansson

The Cardigans chronology
Life (1995)	First Band on the Moon (1996)	The Other Side of the Moon (1997)

Singles from First Band on the Moon
- 1. "Lovefool" Released: 10 August 1996; 2. "Been It" Released: 25 November 1996; 3. "Your New Cuckoo" Released: 9 December 1996

First Band on the Moon is the third studio album by Swedish rock band the Cardigans. It features the international single "Lovefool". It was first released on 6 September 1996.

The album marked a major breakthrough for the band, both in Sweden and internationally. It is their best-selling album in the United States, with approximately 664,000 copies sold there as of September 2010.

== Critical reception ==
Professional ratings
Review scores
Source	Rating
AllMusic	4.5/5 stars
Entertainment Weekly	B+
The Guardian	4/5 stars
Los Angeles Times	3/4 stars
NME	8/10
Pitchfork	8.1/10
Q	4/5 stars
Rolling Stone	4/5 stars
Spin	7/10
The Village Voice	B+

AllMusic critic John Bush viewed First Band on the Moon as a return to the "mood and feel" of the Cardigans' 1994 debut album Emmerdale, with a new lyrical focus on "unfaithful lovers" and, in the case of "Lovefool", "unrequited affection". He noted that while its stylistic shift from its 1995 predecessor Life may confuse listeners, the album is buoyed by Nina Persson's vocals and Peter Svensson's arrangements, "the Cardigans' core strengths".

== Track listing ==
No.	Title	Writer(s)	Length
1.	"Your New Cuckoo"	Nina Persson, Peter Svensson	3:57
2.	"Been It"	Persson, Svensson	4:06
3.	"Heartbreaker"	Persson, Svensson	3:42
4.	"Happy Meal II"	Lynette Koyana, Persson, Magnus Sveningsson, Svensson	2:37
5.	"Never Recover"	Sveningsson, Svensson	3:21
6.	"Step on Me"	Sveningsson, Svensson	3:48
7.	"Lovefool"	Persson, Svensson	3:21
8.	"Losers"	Persson, Svensson	3:06
9.	"Iron Man" (Black Sabbath cover from Paranoid)	Geezer Butler, Tony Iommi, Ozzy Osbourne, Bill Ward	4:20
10.	"Great Divide"	Sveningsson, Svensson	3:17
11.	"Choke"	Sveningsson, Svensson	3:26
Total length:			39:01

"Happy Meal II" is a re-recording of "Happy Meal", a song that was originally a bonus track on the US edition of Life, with some minor lyric changes.

=== Black Sabbath connections ===
At least two songs on the album directly reference Black Sabbath material. In addition to the cover "Iron Man", "Heartbreaker" begins and ends with a quotation of the primary material from the song "Black Sabbath", the first track on Black Sabbath's debut album.

== Personnel ==
Credits adapted from the liner notes of First Band On The Moon.

The Cardigans

- Lars-Olof Johansson – keyboards, piano
- Bengt Lagerberg – drums, percussion
- Nina Persson – lead vocals
- Magnus Sveningsson – bass, vocals
- Peter Svensson – guitar, vocals

"Your New Cuckoo"

- Åva Håkansson – violin
- Inga Zeppezauer – violin
- Mattias Svensson – violin
- Maria Holm – violin
- David Wilczewski – flute
- Lynette Koyana – background vocals

"Heartbreaker"

- Petter Lindgård – trumpet
- Patrik Bartosch – clavinet
- Ulf Thuresson – background vocals

"Never Recover"

- David Wilczewski – flute

"Losers"

- Annette Helmers – cello

"Great Divide"

- Ronnie Weber – violin
- Gabriele Freese – violin
- Anna Berström – violin
- Ivan Bakran – cello, double bass

"Choke"

- Jens Lindgård – trombone
- Sven Andersson – saxophone

== Singles ==
- "Lovefool" (9 September 1996, #21 UK)
- "Been It" (25 November 1996, #56 UK)
- "Lovefool" (re-release 24 February 1997, #2 UK)
- "Your New Cuckoo" (25 August 1997, #35 UK)

Release dates refer to UK single releases. In Europe and Japan, "Your New Cuckoo" was released much earlier than in the UK, where the release was delayed due to the continued success of "Lovefool" and also to commission new remixes for the single release.

"Been It" and "Your New Cuckoo" were both slightly shortened for single release; the former also had the word "whore" obscured by a guitar lick to make it more palatable for radio play.

== Charts ==
=== Weekly charts ===
Chart (1996–97)	Peak; position
Australian Albums (ARIA Charts)	52
Canadian Albums (RPM)	41
Finnish Albums (Suomen virallinen lista)	16
German Albums (Offizielle Top 100)	83
Japanese Albums (Oricon)	4
New Zealand Albums (RMNZ)	12
Scottish Albums (Official Charts)	24
Swedish Albums (Sverigetopplistan)	2
UK Albums (Official Charts)	18
US Billboard 200	35
US Top Heatseekers (Billboard)	3

=== Year-end charts ===
Chart (1997)	Position
US Billboard 200	137

=== Single charts ===
United States

- Billboard Hot 100 Airplay: "Lovefool"; #1
- Billboard Adult Top 40: "Lovefool"; #2
- Billboard Modern Rock Tracks: "Lovefool"; #9
- Billboard Top 40 Mainstream: "Lovefool"; #1
- Billboard Adult Contemporary: "Lovefool"; #23
- Billboard Hot Dance Music/Club Play: "Lovefool"; #5
- Billboard Hot Dance Music/Maxisingle Sales: "Lovefool; #24
- Billboard Rhythmic Top 40: "Lovefool"; #18
- Billboard Top 40 Adult Recurrents: "Lovefool" #1

UK

- UK Radio Airplay: "Lovefool"; #1
- UK Top 100 Singles: "Lovefool"; #21, "Been It"; #56, "Lovefool" (Re-issue); #2, "Your New Cuckoo"; #35

Australia

- ARIA Top 100 Singles 1997 Year-End Chart: "Lovefool"; #52

Sweden

- Swedish Top 100 Singles 1996 Year-end Chart: "Lovefool"; #60

== Certifications ==
Region	Certification	Certified units/sales
Canada (Music Canada)	Platinum	100,000^{^}
Japan (RIAJ)	2× Platinum	400,000^{^}
Sweden (GLF)	Gold	50,000^{^}
United Kingdom (BPI)	Gold	100,000^{^}
United States (RIAA)	Platinum	1,000,000^{^}
^{^} Shipments figures based on certification alone.
