= Been It =

1996 single by the Cardigans

Single by the Cardigans

from the album First Band on the Moon
- B-side: "Blah Blah Blah"
- Released: 25 November 1996
- Studio: Tambourine (Malmö, Sweden)
- Genre: Alternative rock
- Length: 4:05
- Label: Stockholm; Trampolene
- Songwriters: Peter Svensson; Nina Persson
- Producer: Tore Johansson

The Cardigans singles chronology
"Lovefool" (1996)	"Been It" (1996)	"Your New Cuckoo" (1996)

"Been It" is a song by a Swedish band called the Cardigans. It was released from their third studio album entitled First Band on the Moon. In additional to reaching number 56 on the UK Singles Chart, the song also became an alternative hit in Canada, climbing to number nine on the RPM Alternative 30.

== Formats and track listings ==
All songs were written by composers Nina Persson and Peter Svensson.

- German CD single
1. "Been It" (censored radio edit) – 3:41
2. "Blah Blah Blah" – 2:58
- European, UK, and Australia CD single
1. "Been It" (censored radio edit) – 3:41
2. "Been It" (radio edit) – 3:40
3. "Blah Blah Blah" – 2:58
4. "Losers" (first try) – 3:15
- UK limited-edition 7-inch single

A. "Been It" (censored radio edit) – 3:41
B. "Been It" (radio edit) – 3:40

- US 12-inch single
1. "Been It" (Tee's Freeze mix) – 6:59
2. "Been It" (Tee's Inhouse vocal) – 6:15
3. "Lovefool" (Tee's Indeep mix) – 7:56
4. "Lovefool" (Tee's Freeze club) – 7:10
- Canadian and US CD single
1. "Been It" (Tee's Freeze mix) – 6:59
2. "Been It" (Tee's Inhouse vocal) – 6:16
3. "Been It" (album version) – 4:06
4. "Lovefool" (Tee's Indeep mix) – 7:58
5. "Lovefool" (Tee's Freeze club) – 7:10

== Credits and personnel ==
Credits are adapted from the liner notes of First Band on the Moon.

Musicians

- Nina Persson – lead vocals
- Peter Svensson – guitar
- Magnus Sveningsson – bass
- Lars-Olof Johansson – keyboards
- Bengt Lagerberg – drums and percussion

Technical personnel

- Tore Johansson – engineering and production
- Roger Jonsson – mastering

== Charts ==
Chart (1996–1997)	Peak position
Canada Rock/Alternative (RPM)	9
Scottish Singles Sales (Official Charts)	54
UK Singles (Official Charts)	56

== Release history ==
Region	Date	Format(s)	Label(s)	Ref.
United Kingdom	25 November 1996	CD; cassette	Stockholm	
United States	22 April 1997	Contemporary hit radio	Mercury	
United States	24 June 1997	CD	Mercury	
