= Erase/Rewind =

1999 single by the Cardigans

- CD Single, part 1

Single by the Cardigans

from the album Gran Turismo
- Released: 20 January 1999
- Genre: Alternative pop; electronica
- Length: 3:35
- Label: Stockholm; Polydor
- Songwriters: Peter Svensson; Nina Persson
- Producer: Tore Johansson

The Cardigans singles chronology
"My Favourite Game" (1998)	"Erase/Rewind" (1999)	"Hanging Around" (1999)

Alternative cover
- CD single part 2

Music video
- "Erase/Rewind" on YouTube

"Erase/Rewind" is a song written by Peter Svensson and Nina Persson for the Cardigans' fourth studio album, Gran Turismo (1998). The song is the album's second track and was released as its second single in January 1999, reaching number three in Iceland, number seven in Italy and the United Kingdom, and number 12 in Sweden. It was featured in the 1999 film The Thirteenth Floor during the ending credits. It was also featured in the 1999 film Never Been Kissed when Josie (Drew Barrymore) dances with her prom date Guy (Jeremy Jordan).

== Critical reception ==
Birmingham Evening Mail wrote, "The Swedish five-piece decrease the tempo slightly for this lilting ballad which is not quite as catchy as 'My Favourite Game' – which spent a massive three months in the UK top 40 – but should still confirm the band as being back in the big time."

== Music video ==
The official music video was directed by Swedish director Adam Berg. It features science-fiction references to Star Wars and 2001: A Space Odyssey. At least three versions of the video exist. In one version, the walls which close on the band while performing nearly crush them before a camera pointing at them shuts down. Another version shows the walls stopping and a door opening in front of them. A variant of the latter shows several clips from The Thirteenth Floor during the video. At the end of the video, the band members begin to destroy their musical instruments.

== Credits and personnel ==
- Vocals: Nina Persson
- Guitar: Peter Svensson
- Bass: Magnus Sveningsson
- Keyboard: Lars-Olof Johansson
- Drums: Bengt Lagerberg
- Recorded at Country Hell, Tambourine Studios, Skurup, Sweden
- Producer: Tore Johansson
- Engineer: Tore Johansson, Janne Waldenmark
- Assistant engineer: Lars Göransson
- Audio mixing: Tore Johansson
- Mixing assistant: Jim Caruana
- Mastering by: Björn Engelmann Cutting Room Studios

== Charts ==
=== Weekly charts ===
Weekly chart performance for "Erase/Rewind"
Chart (1999)	Peak position
Denmark (IFPI)	17
Europe (Eurochart Hot 100)	23
France (SNEP)	60
Germany (GfK)	71
Greece (IFPI)	10
Hungary (Mahasz)	9
Iceland (Íslenski Listinn Topp 40)	3
Ireland (IRMA)	16
Italy (Musica e dischi)	7
Italy Airplay (Music & Media)	2
Netherlands (Dutch Top 40 Tipparade)	14
Netherlands (Single Top 100)	62
New Zealand (Recorded Music NZ)	36
Norway (VG-lista)	14
Scotland Singles (OCC)	10
Sweden (Sverigetopplistan)	12
Switzerland (Schweizer Hitparade)	39
UK Singles (OCC)	7

=== Year-end charts ===
Year-end chart performance for "Erase/Rewind"
Chart (1999)	Position
Europe Border Breakers (Music & Media)	8
European Radio Top 50 (Music & Media)	39
Italy (Musica e dischi)	49
UK Singles (OCC)	141

== Certifications ==
Certifications and sales for "Erase/Rewind"
Region	Certification	Certified units/sales
United Kingdom (BPI)	Silver	200,000^{‡}
^{‡} Sales+streaming figures based on certification alone.

== Release history ==
Release dates and formats for "Erase/Rewind"
Region	Date	Format(s)	Label(s)	Ref.
Japan	20 January 1999	CD	Stockholm	
United Kingdom	22 February 1999	CD; cassette	Stockholm; Polydor	
United States	19 April 1999	Modern rock radio	Stockholm	
