= Don't Blame Your Daughter (Diamonds) =

Single by the Cardigans

from the album Super Extra Gravity
- Released: 6 February 2006
- Length: 3:37
- Label: Stockholm
- Songwriters: Nathan Larson, Nina Persson, Peter Svensson

The Cardigans singles chronology
"I Need Some Fine Wine and You, You Need to Be Nicer" (2005)	"Don't Blame Your Daughter (Diamonds)" (2006)

Music video
- "Don't Blame Your Daughter (Diamonds)" on YouTube

"Don't Blame Your Daughter (Diamonds)" is a rock song by the Cardigans. It was released as the second single from their sixth album Super Extra Gravity in Europe in February 2006.

== Music video ==
The music video was directed by the Renck brothers: Johan Renck, who also directed Madonna's "Hung Up" video, and Martin Renck. It starts with a scene of a woman sitting at an old table, opening a music box. As she looks inside, a crystal ball on the table is shown with an image of a Séance with five people holding hands at the table inside of it. The next scene shows Nina Persson sitting at the table with a blonde, a redhead, a brunette and a raven-haired woman dressed in unusual clothing. The scene shifts to the woman from the beginning (the brunette) carrying furniture through a forest. Back at the table, she disappears, and becomes replaced with a male band member, wearing similar clothing to hers. As the video goes on, the blonde is shown riding through the forest in a carriage driven by a hooded figure in black, also disappearing from the table and being replaced by a band member in similar clothing. The same thing happens to the redhead, who is shown constrained underwater in an algae-like fashion, and the raven-haired woman, who appears to be in a small boat in a lake, calling out for someone. The video ends with Persson at the table with the rest of the band, all of them now male and the women gone, holding hands.

== Track listings ==
- CD single 1
1. "Don't Blame Your Daughter (Diamonds)" – 3:37
2. "Hanging Around" (Live in Kiev) – 4:33
3. "Higher" (Live in Kiev) – 4:35
- CD single 2
1. "Don't Blame Your Daughter (Diamonds)"
2. "(If You Were) Less Like Me"
- Digital single (released April 2006)
1. "Don't Blame Your Daughter (Diamonds)"
2. "A Good Horse" (Live at Bayview)

== Charts ==
Chart (2006)	Peak position
Sweden (Sverigetopplistan)	49
