= Brainpool (band) =

Swedish pop music group

- Origin: Sweden
- Genres: Pop, Rock
- Years active: 1993–present
- Members: David Birde; Christoffer Lundquist; Jens Jansson
- Past members: Jan "Janne" Kask

Brainpool is a pop music group from Lund, Sweden. The band was most popular in the mid-1990s, mostly in the Swedish indie-pop scene together with other bands like Eggstone or Beagle.

== History ==
This Swedish band was formed in Lund, Scania, and the original members were vocalist Jan "Janne" Kask, guitarist David Birde, bassist Christoffer Lundquist, and drummer Jens Jansson. The band signed to Per Gessle's music publishing company Jimmy Fun Music and released three albums: Soda (1994; Swedish Grammy as New Band), Painkiller (1995) and Stay Free (1996). They took part as support act during the European Crash! Boom! Bang! Tour by Roxette in 1994.

Janne Kask left the band in 1997 to pursue a solo career. For a while the other band members were looking for a new lead singer, but soon gave up. "It didn't take long for us to realize that it would be impossible to let another person join", David Birde explained in an interview to The Daily Roxette. "It would have to be the three of us, or split up. At first we thought about changing our name, but that turned out to be difficult - Sony Music had already paid for the recording of You Are Here and they wanted us to keep the name. We had to choose between ditching the recordings and lose our record deal or go on calling ourselves Brainpool. We cowardly chose the latter."

The band not only decided to stay together after Kask left, but they decided to change their style and their music. "We realized our audience was getting younger. We were 26, we were smelly and unshaven and drunk. There were 11- and 12-year-old fans who wanted a hug, we just thought it was so wrong, that's when we realized we had to do something else," says David. It was time for their music to reach the level of maturity that they were at.

You Are Here was released in 1999. After this release, the band worked for 4 years on a rock opera which was finally released in 2004 with the name Junk and with the topic of anti-consumerism. The premiere was in Malmö on August 19, 2004 where the band was backed up by Malmö Symphony Orchestra. The album was published by the band's own publishing company Junk Musik which releases singles only on the Internet.

In 2005, Brainpool released the compilation We Aimed To Please. The album only contains songs from 1992 to 1997 when Janne Kask was still in the band. There are no songs from You Are Here or Junk.

In May 2007 Brainpool's Junk: A Rock Opera premiered at a small venue in Los Angeles to mixed fan reviews. It sold out 36 shows, and, in the beginning of 2009, was performed as a staged reading off-Broadway in New York City.

== Members ==
- Christoffer Lundquist started in the band as a bass player and backing vocalist, but has moved to play both the bass and the guitar. He has recorded and/or produced albums by Per Gessle, Gyllene Tider, Ed Harcourt, Christian Kjellvander, Helena Josefsson, ... in his own studio in Scania, AGM Studios. He played in the backing groups of Per Gessle since 1998.
- David Birde, guitar player, songwriter and lyricist. He also became the lead singer since You Are Here. He has released some single songs with Magnus Börjeson from Beagle as 'Metro Jets'.
- Jens Jansson, drummer. He has played and recorded with many international artists: Peter von Poehl, Per Gessle, Righteous Boy, Florian Horwath, ...
- Jan "Janne" Kask is a former member of the band, singer and songwriter. He had a hit as a solo artist with Golden Heart. Currently, he is studying medical education at Uppsala University.
- James SK Wān – bamboo flute

== Discography ==
=== Albums ===
- Soda (1994)
- Painkiller (1995)
- Stay Free (1996)
- You Are Here (1999)
- Junk (2004)
- We Aimed To Please - Best Of Brainpool, Vol. 1 (2005)

=== Singles ===
- At School / Popstar (1993)
- Every Day (1994)
- Girl Lost (1994)
- In The Countryside (1994)
- That's My Charm (1994)
- Bandstarter (1995)
- We Aim To Please (1995)
- Tomorrow (1995)
- Sister C'mon (1996)
- In A Box (1996)
- My Sweet Lord (She's So Fine) (1997)
- You Are Here (1999)
- Live Transmission (1999)
- Junk (2004)
- Metro Jets Premier Concert (2005)
- A Different Life (2005)
