= Live and Learn (The Cardigans song) =

Single by the Cardigans

from the album Long Gone Before Daylight
- Released: 3 December 2003
- Genre: Pop, indie rock, alternative rock
- Label: Stockholm Records
- Songwriters: Nina Persson, Peter Svensson

The Cardigans singles chronology
"You're the Storm" (2003)	"Live and Learn" (2003)	"I Need Some Fine Wine and You, You Need to Be Nicer" (2005)

"Live and Learn" is a song by the rock group the Cardigans, and is the third and final single from the album, Long Gone Before Daylight. All music by Peter Svensson, and all lyrics by Nina Persson. The song appears on episode 2 of Grey's Anatomy, and in a season 9 episode of Scrubs. The song is a straight love song about learning love, her thinking of what her love is worth.

Guest vocals performed by The Soundtrack of Our Lives singer, Ebbot Lundberg

== Track listings ==
- CD single
1. "Live and Learn"
2. "If There Is a Chance"
- Maxi single
1. "Live and Learn"
2. "If There Is a Chance"
3. "Changes" (BBC Radio 2 Session)
4. "My Favourite Game" (BBC Radio 2 Session)
