= My Favourite Game =

1998 single by the Cardigans

Single by the Cardigans

from the album Gran Turismo
- B-side: "War"; "Sick & Tired" (live)
- Released: 14 September 1998
- Studio: Country Hell (Skurup, Sweden)
- Genre: Alternative rock
- Length: 3:36
- Label: Stockholm; Polydor
- Songwriters: Peter Svensson; Nina Persson
- Producers: Tore Johansson; Peter Collins

The Cardigans singles chronology
"Your New Cuckoo" (1996)	"My Favourite Game" (1998)	"Erase/Rewind" (1999)

Audio sample
- The Cardigans - "My Favourite Game": file; help

Music video
- "My Favourite Game" on YouTube

"My Favourite Game" is an alternative rock song written by Peter Svensson and Nina Persson for Swedish band the Cardigans' fourth studio album, Gran Turismo (1998). The song is the album's eighth track and was released as its first single on 14 September 1998. Lyrically, it is about a failing relationship and the attempt made to better the significant other or save people from themselves.

"My Favourite Game" achieved international success, reaching number one in Greece, number three in Sweden and number 14 in the United Kingdom. It also charted within the top 40 in several European countries and New Zealand. While it failed to chart on the US Billboard Hot 100, it peaked at number 16 on the Billboard Modern Rock Tracks chart.

The accompanying music video was directed by Jonas Åkerlund and features Persson joydriving on a desert road. It was censored due to its imagery of car crashes and reckless driving and resulted it being recut to tone down the violence and appear on music channels. The song was included in the 1999 video game Gran Turismo 2.

== Songwriting, recording and production ==
"My Favourite Game" was written by guitarist Peter Svensson and lead singer Nina Persson during the recording sessions of the band's fourth studio album Gran Turismo between May and July 1998. The song, like the other songs from the album, was recorded in Tore Johansson's newly developed Country Hell recording studio in Skurup, Sweden. Persson started with the chorus, which "married the music so quickly that you couldn't tear them apart". Afterwards she wrote verses to "give the chorus meaning", which enabled her to "cram in a lot of lyrics into the verses" in contrast to other Cardigans songs with fewer lyrics such as "Erase/Rewind".

Before recording on the song commenced, Svensson presented the song to producer Tore Johansson by playing the track on acoustic guitar. Although the song was originally taking shape as a slow country/rock shuffle, similar in style to Neil Young's "Old Man", the tempo was doubled upon request of Tore Johansson. Svensson declared that this helped as the band knew the song "was a single, but it wasn't working at first" under "the shuffle beat at half the tempo". Soon after changing the musical direction of the song, its distinctive guitar hook evolved.

Both the drum and guitar parts were recorded in a "'70s-style dry room" while the vocals were recorded in the attic of the studio.

Even though the drums were recorded using analogue tape compression, the rest of the song's production, including the "fat fuzzy bass line" and the coda, was completed using Pro Tools 24.

== Structure and lyrics ==
"My Favourite Game" is an alternative rock song composed in the key of C Minor. It is written in common time and moves at 143 beats per minute. The song is not written in standard verse-chorus form and its instrumentation includes guitar, bass and organ.

The lyrics deal with a failing relationship, summed up by Persson as "fucking up in love", and the subsequent desire to change the loved one "to suit themselves better or save people from themselves". Svensson commented how this concept "isn't always a good idea, like when women stay in a relationship with a man that beats them because they think he'll be better someday". The song is driven by its two-note guitar riff which is the basis of the "electro-rock powerhouse". Its verses are significantly faster than the slow, bass-heavy chorus where the drums run at half-time.

== Critical reception ==
Chuck Taylor of Billboard wrote, "This first single from the Swedish outfit's upcoming fourth studio album, "Gran Turismo", is already gaining ground in the U.K. and looks poised to find favor stateside, first at modern rock, then adult top 40 and triple-A. Don't expect the cutesy overtones of "Lovefool"; this track is consistent with the band's more typical rock-fueled roots. Led by a pumped electric guitar hook, fuzzy bass, and a distinctive, pleading vocal from lead singer Nina Persson, the song effuses an overall groovy vibe that should help its crossover to the mainstream side. This record does take a couple spins to get the overall feel, but it's worth the ride once you give it a whirl around the block."

== Chart performance ==
In Sweden, "My Favourite Game" debuted at number 21 on the Hitlistan chart and peaked at number three in November 1998. It spent a total of 18 weeks in the chart. In the United Kingdom, it debuted and peaked at number 14 on the UK Singles Chart. On the US Billboard Modern Rock Tracks chart, it became the album's only single and the band's second single to chart, peaking at number 16.

== Music video ==
The music video for "My Favourite Game" was directed by Swedish director Jonas Åkerlund. It was filmed over a three-day shoot in the Mojave Desert near Barstow, California, at a reported cost of £220,000. Nina Persson reported on requiring oxygen several times during the shoot, saying the 110 °F (43 °C) temperature was "hot enough for a Swede to fall down."

The video opens with a scene of lead singer Nina Persson, at the side of a desert road, trying to find a suitable rock. Meanwhile, the radio DJ, who is heard from the car radio, warns drivers that desert temperatures are very hot that day so they must remember to drive safely. When Persson finds a rock, she walks over to her car, a dark blue 1974 Cadillac Eldorado convertible, places it on the accelerator to keep the pedal down and drives off as the song begins. During the video, she weaves back and forth onto the wrong side of the road, forcing many other drivers off the road and causing some to crash in the process. At one point in the video, she throws the Felix the Cat stuffed toy out of the car which was then run over by another car. In some versions of the video, the Felix the Cat doll is blurred out. At one stage of the video, she is also depicted using her feet to steer the steering wheel. There is a large and colourful tattoo on Persson's arm that was added for the video which can be seen rubbing off on the car seat as the video progresses. She also drives at pedestrians causing them to jump out of the way while driving through a small town. At the beginning of the last chorus, she turns the car around and drives back down the road where she caused so much destruction. Towards the end of the song, she stands up in the car seat, leaving the car driving seemingly in a steerless mode and heading into a collision course with an oncoming van, containing the other members of the Cardigans, with drummer Bengt Lagerberg as the driver. While the van's occupants react in horror, she calmly stretches out her arms and makes a cruciform for a moment before the two vehicles collide as the song ends. The DJ sounds the State Patrol's warning "on a high-speed out-of-control vehicle on Route 666" and passes on to commercial.

There are four different outcomes of the car crash at the end of the uncensored video. In ending one, Persson's body goes flying out of her car into the air and over the van roof where she is then depicted as being dead on the road. In ending two, she also flies over the van roof, except she tries to pick herself off the ground but gets knocked out by the rock that was used to keep the car pedal down. In ending three, she also flies out of the car and over the van roof except she manages to pick herself up from the ground and walks away from the accident, and wipes the blood away from her face (this version is censored). In ending four, Persson is depicted being decapitated by the top of her car windscreen and a mannequin head is seen in the next shot, rolling along the road. In the fifth edition, it is censored all out, along with the car crashes, and Nina still is in the car, bloodless, driving and nodding along to the radio.

The music video managed to debut at number twenty-nine on MuchMusic's Countdown in October 1998 and peaked at number twenty-three on 27 November. Also, the video has appeared on many "Greatest Music Video" lists including ranking at 68 in Slant Magazine's "100 Greatest Music Videos" sharing the position with U.N.K.L.E's "Rabbit in Your Headlights", and ranking 95 in Channel 4's "100 Greatest Pop Videos".

=== Censorship ===
The music video caused much controversy when it was first released. Many European channels, including MTV UK, only played an edited version of the video where all of the car crashes and depictions of reckless driving were removed despite director Jonas Åkerlund's attempts to meet the censorship standards by making five differently edited cuts of the video with varying degrees of violence and blood. The reason MTV UK rejected the video was because of fears that the video could encourage joyriding and cause car accidents amongst teenage drivers, so ending five was most played on MTV UK. A more graphic cut was shown on the Cardigans website on a one-time-only basis four days before the single's release. But, in the US, the music channels were less restrictive, as many of them either played the completely uncensored version of the video or a slightly censored version with only a few of the car crashes removed.

== Formats and track listings ==
All songs were written by Nina Persson and Peter Svensson except "Sick & Tired", written by Magnus Sveningsson and Svensson.

- UK CD1
1. "My Favourite Game" – 3:39
2. "War" – 3:57
3. "Sick & Tired" (Live at Hultsfredsfestivalen) – 3:24
- UK CD2
1. "My Favourite Game" – 3:39
2. "My Favourite Game" (Wubble-U's Wubbledub Mix) – 5:58
3. "Lovefool" (Live at Hultsfredsfestivalen) – 3:20
- European "Minimax" CD single
1. "My Favourite Game" – 3:36
2. "War (First Try)" – 4:07
- Australian, Canadian, European, Japanese, and South African CD single
1. "My Favourite Game" – 3:36
2. "War (First Try)" – 4:07
3. "War" – 3:56

== Credits and personnel ==
The Cardigans

- Vocals: Nina Persson
- Guitar: Peter Svensson
- Bass: Magnus Sveningsson
- Guitar, Keyboards: Lars-Olof Johansson
- Drums, Programming: Bengt Lagerberg

Other personnel

- Recorded at Country Hell, Skurup, Sweden
- Producer: Tore Johansson, Peter Collins
- Engineer: Tore Johansson, Peter Collins, John Holbrook, Janne Waldenmark
- Assistant engineer: Lars Göransson, Jim Caruana
- Recording engineer: Tore Johansson
- audio mixing: Tore Johansson
- Mixing assistant: Jim Caruana
- Mastering by: Roger Jonsson

== Charts ==
=== Weekly charts ===
Weekly chart performance for "My Favourite Game"
Chart (1998–1999)	Peak position
Australia (ARIA)	61
Belgium (Ultratop 50 Flanders)	44
Canada Top Singles (RPM)	68
Europe (Eurochart Hot 100)	29
France (SNEP)	27
Germany (GfK)	90
Greece (IFPI)	1
Iceland (Íslenski Listinn Topp 40)	12
Ireland (IRMA)	13
Netherlands (Dutch Top 40)	14
Netherlands (Single Top 100)	15
New Zealand (Recorded Music NZ)	36
Scottish Singles Sales (Official Charts)	10
Sweden (Sverigetopplistan)	3
UK Singles (Official Charts)	14
US Alternative Airplay (Billboard)	16

=== Year-end charts ===
Year-end chart performance for "My Favourite Game"
Chart (1998)	Position
Europe Border Breakers (Music & Media)	24
Sweden (Hitlistan)	25
UK Singles (OCC)	122

Chart (1999)	Position
Europe Border Breakers (Music & Media)	48
UK Airplay (Music Week)	35
US Modern Rock Tracks (Billboard)	39

== Certifications ==
Certifications and sales for "My Favourite Game"
Region	Certification	Certified units/sales
New Zealand (RMNZ)	Gold	15,000^{‡}
Spain (Promusicae)	Gold	30,000^{‡}
Sweden (GLF)	Gold	15,000^{^}
United Kingdom (BPI)	Platinum	600,000^{‡}
^{^} Shipments figures based on certification alone.^{‡} Sales+streaming figures based on certification alone.

== Release history ==
Release dates and formats for "My Favourite Game"
Region	Date	Format(s)	Label(s)	Ref(s).
Sweden	14 September 1998	CD	Stockholm	
United States	28 September 1998	College; modern rock radio	Mercury	
Japan	30 September 1998	CD	Stockholm	
United Kingdom	5 October 1998	CD; cassette	Stockholm; Polydor	
United States	27 October 1998	Top 40; triple A; modern AC radio	Mercury	
