= Long Gone Before Daylight =

Studio album by the Cardigans
- Released: 19 March 2003
- Genres: Rock; country rock; pop
- Length: 49:16
- Label: Stockholm
- Producers: Per Sunding and The Cardigans (Originally co-produced by Tore Johansson)

The Cardigans chronology
Gran Turismo (1998)	Long Gone Before Daylight (2003)	Super Extra Gravity (2005)

Singles from Long Gone Before Daylight
- 1. "For What It's Worth" Released: 5 March 2003; 2. "You're the Storm" Released: 2 June 2003; 3. "Live and Learn" Released: 3 December 2003

Professional ratings
Aggregate scores
Source	Rating
Metacritic	65/100
Review scores
Source	Rating
AllMusic	4/5 stars
Blender	3/5 stars
Entertainment Weekly	B+
The Guardian	4/5 stars
Mojo	4/5 stars
NME	8/10
Pitchfork	6.5/10
Q	3/5 stars
Rolling Stone	3/5 stars
Uncut	2/5 stars

Long Gone Before Daylight is the fifth studio album by Swedish rock band the Cardigans. Released in Japan on 19 March 2003 and in Europe from 24 March by Stockholm Records, it was their first studio album since the release of Gran Turismo in 1998, during which time band members released numerous solo works under assumed aliases: Peter Svensson issued Paus' sole, self-titled album in 1998. This was followed by the release of the self-titled record from Nina Persson's A Camp in 2001, and bassist Magnus Sveningsson's I Sing Because of You (under the Righteous Boy moniker) in 2002.

The album differs from much of the band's earlier work, eschewing the pop and electronic rock sound of previous material in favour of a sparser, alternative rock and country-influenced production. Its lyrical themes are also more mature, with subject matter inspired by domestic abuse, depression, love and fatalism. It received generally positive reviews from music critics upon release, with several reviewers commending it as the band's best album, while praising their compositional work and the change in musical direction.

The band won three awards at the 2003 Grammis—the Swedish equivalent of the Grammy Awards. Long Gone Before Daylight won the "Album of the Year" award while the Cardigans won "Rock Group of the Year". Three singles were released from the album: "For What It's Worth" was released on 17 February 2003. The second single, "You're the Storm", was released on 2 June 2003 and went on to win the award for "Video of the Year" at the Grammis. The third and final single, "Live and Learn", was released on 3 December 2003.

== Track listing ==
All lyrics written by Nina Persson; all music by Peter Svensson, except where noted.

1. "Communication" – 4:28
2. "You're the Storm" – 3:53
3. "A Good Horse" – 3:17
4. "And Then You Kissed Me" – 6:03
5. "Couldn't Care Less" – 5:32
6. "Please Sister" – 4:37
7. "For What It's Worth" – 4:16
8. "Lead Me into the Night" – 4:32
9. "Live and Learn" – 4:16
10. "Feathers and Down" – 4:30
11. "03.45: No Sleep" – 3:45

=== Japanese and Canadian editions bonus track ===
12. "If There Is a Chance" – 4:14

=== UK edition bonus tracks ===
12. "Hold Me" (mini version) – 0:33
13. "If There Is a Chance" – 4:14

=== US edition bonus tracks ===
12. "Hold Me" (mini version) – 0:33
13. "If There Is a Chance" – 4:14
14. "For the Boys" (Music: Svensson Lyrics: Persson, Larson) – 3:37

The US edition also features a bonus DVD, Up Before Dawn, featuring the music videos for "For What It's Worth", "You're the Storm" and "Live and Learn", live video recordings of three songs as well as a 20-minute interview with the band.

Artwork for all singles and album by Åbäke.

== Personnel ==
- Peter Svensson – guitar, vocals
- Magnus Sveningsson – bass, vocals
- Bengt Lagerberg – drums, percussion
- Lars-Olof Johansson – keyboards, piano
- Nina Persson – lead vocals

Additional personnel

- Ebbot Lundberg – guest vocals on "Live and Learn"

== Charts ==
=== Weekly charts ===
Weekly chart performance for Long Gone Before Daylight
Chart (2003–2004)	Peak position
Austrian Albums (Ö3 Austria)	47
Belgian Albums (Ultratop Wallonia)	34
Danish Albums (Hitlisten)	13
Finnish Albums (Suomen virallinen lista)	10
French Albums (SNEP)	47
German Albums (Offizielle Top 100)	24
Irish Albums (IRMA)	34
Japanese Albums (Oricon)	44
Norwegian Albums (VG-lista)	8
Portuguese Albums (AFP)	34
Spanish Albums (Promúsicae)	41
Swedish Albums (Sverigetopplistan)	1
Swiss Albums (Schweizer Hitparade)	22
UK Albums (Official Charts)	47
US Independent Albums (Billboard)	37

=== Year-end charts ===
Year-end chart performance for Long Gone Before Daylight
Chart (2003)	Position
Norwegian Albums (VG-lista)	18
Swedish Albums (Sverigetopplistan)	4
Chart (2004)	Position
Swedish Albums (Sverigetopplistan)	57

== Certifications ==
Certifications for Long Gone Before Daylight
Region	Certification	Certified units/sales
Denmark (IFPI Danmark)	Gold	25,000^{^}
Sweden (GLF)	2× Platinum	120,000^{^}
^{^} Shipments figures based on certification alone.
