= Gran Turismo (album) =

1998 release by the Cardigans

Studio album by the Cardigans
- Released: 19 October 1998
- Recorded: June 1998
- Studios: Country Hell, Skurup, Sweden
- Genres: Trip hop; pop rock; electronic rock; electronica
- Length: 42:36
- Label: Stockholm
- Producer: Tore Johansson

The Cardigans chronology
The Other Side of the Moon (1997)	Gran Turismo (1998)	Long Gone Before Daylight (2003)

Singles from Gran Turismo
- 1. "My Favourite Game" Released: 14 September 1998; 2. "Erase/Rewind" Released: 20 January 1999; 3. "Hanging Around" Released: 12 July 1999

Professional ratings
Review scores
Source	Rating
AllMusic	4/5 stars
The Boston Phoenix	3/4 stars
Entertainment Weekly	B+
The Guardian	4/5 stars
Los Angeles Times	3/4 stars
NME	6/10
Pitchfork	7.0/10
Q	4/5 stars
Rolling Stone	3/5 stars
USA Today	3/4 stars

Gran Turismo is the fourth album by the Swedish rock band the Cardigans, released internationally on 19 October 1998 and in November 1998 in the United States. It features a darker and more moody type of music, mixed with more electronic sounds.

In an interview in 2009, producer and sound engineer Tore Johansson commented on the dark sound of the record, which sets it apart from the warm, jammy feel of many other recordings made at Tambourine Studios: "It's a very cold and defined recording, no natural reverb or audio curtains: there's not a sound element on that disc which wasn't deliberately put there."

The album and band were nominated for a total of seven awards at the 1999 Grammis—the Swedish equivalent of the Grammy Awards. Gran Turismo sold more than three million copies worldwide.

== Background ==
The album's name is explained by the band in a track on an advanced copy of the album titled "Explain the Title of the Album Gran Turismo": "The title can be interpreted in many ways but I think we only thought of a few ones we liked," Nina says. "We talked about having like Italian or French title and Gran Turismo came up and it sort of felt really good and you know I can think of music sometimes as tourism and traveling. So to me Gran Turismo is sort of the way to describe music sometimes or spending time with music." Peter says, "and I think that also the title suits this very album extremely well because the album is pretty much about trying to find your place in the world. I think sometimes you can always compare living to being a tourist in the world," Nina finishes.

== Track listing ==
All tracks are written by Nina Persson and Peter Svensson, except where noted.

Gran Turismo track listing
No.	Title	Writer(s)	Length
1.	"Paralyzed"		4:54
2.	"Erase/Rewind"		3:35
3.	"Explode"		4:04
4.	"Starter"		3:49
5.	"Hanging Around"		3:40
6.	"Higher"		4:32
7.	"Marvel Hill"	Persson, Magnus Sveningsson, Svensson	4:16
8.	"My Favourite Game"		3:36
9.	"Do You Believe"		3:19
10.	"Junk of the Hearts"	Persson, Sveningsson, Svensson	4:07
11.	"Nil" (instrumental)	Lars-Olof Johansson	2:18

== Personnel ==
- Peter Svensson – guitar, vocals
- Magnus Sveningsson – bass, vocals
- Bengt Lagerberg – drums, percussion
- Lars-Olof Johansson – keyboards, piano
- Nina Persson – lead vocals

== Singles ==
- "My Favourite Game" (10 October 1998, No. 14 UK)
- "Erase/Rewind" (28 February 1999, No. 7 UK)
- "Hanging Around" (17 July 1999, No. 17 UK)
- Gran Turismo Overdrive EP (The Cardigans remixed by Nåid) (19 November 1999, released outside the UK)

== Charts ==
=== Weekly charts ===
Weekly chart performance for Gran Turismo
Chart (1998–1999)	Peak position
Austrian Albums (Ö3 Austria)	43
Belgian Albums (Ultratop Flanders)	22
Belgian Albums (Ultratop Wallonia)	24
Canadian Albums (RPM)	30
Danish Albums (Hitlisten)	2
Dutch Albums (Album Top 100)	27
European Albums (Billboard)	8
Finnish Albums (Suomen virallinen lista)	8
French Albums (SNEP)	44
German Albums (Offizielle Top 100)	38
Irish Albums (IRMA)	8
Italian Albums (FIMI)	10
Japanese Albums (Oricon)	19
New Zealand Albums (RMNZ)	24
Norwegian Albums (VG-lista)	2
Spanish Albums (Promúsicae)	35
Swedish Albums (Sverigetopplistan)	1
UK Albums (Official Charts)	8
US Billboard 200	151

=== Year-end charts ===
Year-end chart performance for Gran Turismo
Chart (1998)	Position
Swedish Albums (Sverigetopplistan)	30
Chart (1999)	Position
Belgian Albums (Ultratop Flanders)	94
Belgian Albums (Ultratop Wallonia)	89
Italian Albums (FIMI)	46
Swedish Albums (Sverigetopplistan)	48
UK Albums (OCC)	38

== Certifications ==
Certifications for Gran Turismo
Region	Certification	Certified units/sales
Denmark (IFPI Danmark)	Platinum	50,000^{^}
France (SNEP)	Gold	100,000^{*}
Japan (RIAJ)	Gold	100,000^{^}
Netherlands (NVPI)	Gold	50,000^{^}
Norway (IFPI Norway)	Platinum	50,000^{*}
Sweden (GLF)	2× Platinum	160,000^{^}
United Kingdom (BPI)	Platinum	520,000
Summaries
Europe (IFPI)	Platinum	1,000,000^{*}
Worldwide	—	3,000,000
^{*} Sales figures based on certification alone.^{^} Shipments figures based on certification alone.
