= For What It's Worth (The Cardigans song) =

2003 single by the Cardigans

Single by the Cardigans

from the album Long Gone Before Daylight
- B-side: "The Road", "Das Model"
- Released: 5 March 2003
- Length: 4:18
- Label: Stockholm
- Songwriters: Peter Svensson, Nina Persson
- Producer: Per Sunding

The Cardigans singles chronology
"Burning Down the House" (1999)	"For What It's Worth" (2003)	"You're the Storm" (2003)

"For What It's Worth" is the first single from Swedish band the Cardigans's fifth studio album, Long Gone Before Daylight (2003). It was released on 5 March 2003, reaching number eight in the band's native Sweden, number 31 in the United Kingdom, number 37 in Ireland, and number 98 in the Netherlands. Nicky Wire, bassist of the Manic Street Preachers, thinks this song has the best lyrics. The music video was directed by Amir Chamdin.

== Track listings ==
Scandinavian CD single

1. "For What It's Worth" – 4:16
2. "The Road" – 6:50

European and Japanese CD single

1. "For What It's Worth" – 4:18
2. "The Road" – 6:52
3. "For What It's Worth" (Polar Session '01) – 4:16
4. "Das Model" ('00) – 2:53

UK maxi-CD single

1. "For What It's Worth" – 4:16
2. "Das Model" ('00) – 2:53
3. "The Road" – 6:52
4. "For What It's Worth" (video—director's cut) – 4:16

UK cassette single

1. "For What It's Worth" – 4:16
2. "Das Model" ('00) – 2:53
3. "The Road" – 6:52

== Charts ==
=== Weekly charts ===
Chart (2003)	Peak position
Europe (Eurochart Hot 100)	76
Ireland (IRMA)	37
Netherlands (Single Top 100)	98
Romania (Romanian Top 100)	67
Scotland Singles (OCC)	39
Sweden (Sverigetopplistan)	8
UK Singles (OCC)	31

=== Year-end charts ===
Chart (2003)	Position
Sweden (Hitlistan)	90

== Release history ==
Region	Date	Format(s)	Label(s)	Ref(s).
Japan	5 March 2003	CD	Universal Music Japan	
United Kingdom	10 March 2003	CD; cassette	Stockholm	
United States	19 April 2003	Triple A radio	Stockholm	
