= You're the Storm =

Single by the Cardigans

from the album Long Gone Before Daylight
- Released: 2 June 2003
- Recorded: 2001–2003
- Genre: Pop, indie rock, alternative rock
- Length: 3:53
- Label: Stockholm Records
- Songwriters: Nina Persson, Peter Svensson
- Producer: Per Sunding

The Cardigans singles chronology
"For What It's Worth" (2003)	"You're the Storm" (2003)	"Live and Learn" (2003)

"You're the Storm" is the second single by the Cardigans from their album Long Gone Before Daylight. It was released on 14 July 2003 in Europe.

== Video ==
The official video was directed by Amir Chamdin who had previously directed the video for For What It's Worth. The video was nominated as "Best Video" at the Grammis Awards. In 2004 Amir Chamdin received the MTV Award for Best Music Video.

== Track listings ==
- CD Single
1. "You're The Storm"
2. "Hold Me"
- Maxi Single
1. "You're The Storm"
2. "Hold Me"
3. "You're The Storm" (Sandkvie Session)
4. "You're The Storm" (First Demo)

== Charts ==
Chart	Peak position
Swedish Singles Chart	10
UK Singles Chart	74
