= Lovefool =

1996 single by the Cardigans

- Original cover art

Single by the Cardigans

from the album First Band on the Moon
- B-side: "Nasty Sunny Beam"; "Iron Man" (first try)
- Released: 10 August 1996
- Studio: Tambourine (Malmö, Sweden)
- Genre: Disco-pop; pop rock; art pop; bubblegum pop
- Length: 3:21
- Label: Stockholm; Trampolene
- Songwriters: Peter Svensson; Nina Persson
- Producer: Tore Johansson

The Cardigans singles chronology
"Hey! Get Out of My Way" (1995)	"Lovefool" (1996)	"Been It" (1996)

Music videos
- "Lovefool" on YouTube; "Lovefool" (second version) on YouTube

"Lovefool" is a song written by Peter Svensson and Nina Persson for Swedish rock band the Cardigans' third studio album, First Band on the Moon (1996). It was released as the album's lead single on 10 August 1996 in Japan. In the United States, the song was serviced to radio two days later. A few months after its release, the track was included in the Baz Luhrmann film Romeo + Juliet, helping the song gain international recognition.

"Lovefool" peaked at number two on the UK Singles Chart following a re-release in 1997 and achieved moderate success on other European charts. In North America, it reached number three in Canada and number two on the US Billboard Hot 100 Airplay chart (it did not appear on the Hot 100 due to rules in place at the time). In Australasia, the song topped the New Zealand Singles Chart and climbed to number 11 in Australia, earning gold sales certifications in both regions. Three different music videos were produced to accompany the song.

== Background ==
Persson wrote the song's lyrics at an airport while waiting for a plane. She later said the song is "quite a sad love song; the meaning of it is quite pathetic, really." She added, "the biggest hits are the ones that are the easiest to write".

Persson said that, at the time, the song "was slower and more of a bossa nova". She said the band recognized its potential commercial appeal: "We definitely were aware that it was a single and a catchy song when we wrote it, but the direction it took is not something we could have predicted. It wasn't necessarily our character; it felt like a bit of a freak on the record—which, objectively, it still is. But then when we were recording, by chance, our drummer started to play that kind of disco beat, and there was no way to get away from it after that".

== Music and structure ==
"Lovefool" modulates based on chorus and verse. The chorus is in A major, with a I–IV–ii–V chord progression. The verses use a vi–ii–V–I chord progression in C major. It is in common time and moves at 112 beats per minute. The song's middle 8 is four bars long.

== Release ==
The song was a hit in several European countries, reaching number 15 on the Swedish Singles Chart and peaking at number 21 on the UK Singles Chart during its first release in 1996. After it appeared in Romeo + Juliet, it gained international attention, eventually reaching a new peak of number two on the UK Singles Chart following a re-release in April 1997. It then achieved international success, becoming a number-one hit in New Zealand and peaking just outside the top 10 in Australia at number 11. "Lovefool" became a crossover hit in the US after peaking at number nine on the Billboard Modern Rock Tracks chart, reaching number two on the Hot 100 Airplay chart. It reached number one on the Top 40/Mainstream chart and number two on the Adult Top 40, staying there for eight nonconsecutive weeks. The single did not chart on the Hot 100 at the time; singles not made commercially available in the US were ineligible.

In Persson's words, the immense commercial success of "Lovefool" "freaked me out". She said, "We were kind of snobs. We felt like these things were glitzy, and we felt like, 'No, no, we're a rock band!'"

== Critical reception ==
Kevin Courtney of Irish Times called the song "a quirky, bittersweet tune about love, loss and lies." Tom Moon of Knight-Ridder Newspapers called it "mercilessly catchy", writing that it "has become a rallying cry for jilted lovers everywhere." Sara Scribner of Los Angeles Times opined that Persson "begs for lies" on an "almost criminally catchy" tune. Bryan Lark of The Michigan Daily called it a "sugary sing-along". Thanos Lolis of Miscellany News called it "three minutes of sparkly, ABBAesque disco, very danceable and very capable of making a global hit." He also called it "catchy kitsch-in-sync". Pan-European magazine Music & Media called it a "trademark Cardigans track", adding, "this energetic mid-tempo single suggests summertime follies and lazy craziness. The cheerful chorus hints at old time disco." Music Week gave it a score of four out of five, writing, "Prepare for world domination by these Swedish popsters, whose first single [...] takes their candy pop style and injects it with a distinct Seventies disco feel." Music Week editor Alan Jones added, "It's a quaint and quirky pop nugget with a smooth, caressing vocal and a sublime hook. It seems certain to earn the group their biggest hit yet."

Mark Sutherland of NME called it "dizzy disco". A reviewer from People magazine called it "boppy". Jason Cohen of Rolling Stone wrote that Persson's "airy lack of affectation actually deepens her dark, romantic sentiments when she chirps cheerily about her status as a willingly deceived doormat". Charles Aaron of Spin called it "lounge music so chilly with irony that you better bring a sweater, binky." Nick Mirov of The Stanford Daily wrote that Persson was "sounding self-assured and confident" while "getting her own heart broken". Jaime Holguin of Star-News called it a "kitschy pop gem" and "sticky sweet". Ian Hyland of Sunday Mirror named it the "best pop song" of 1997.

== Retrospective response ==
Justin Chadwick of Albumism said "Lovefool" is "one of the more exciting straight-ahead pop songs of the contemporary era", calling it "pure, exquisitely produced pop perfection." John Bush of AllMusic deemed it a "depressing lament of unrequited affection". Annie Zaleski of The A.V. Club described it as "giddy". Dave Fawbert of ShortList wrote, "It's one of the best things in life when a song comes along, you listen to it, and you just think: "Well, that's perfect isn't it?" Every little bit of this three minutes and 14 seconds is absolutely, utterly unimprovable, from the little bllllrrrrring guitar intro, all the way through to that gorgeous ritardando and final chord at the end. Impossibly stylish, groovy and ice cool, this is, you'll be unsurprised to hear, still brilliant, fully 20 years on. The Swedes, they build things to last—Volvos and 'Lovefool', two sides of the same coin." Sal Cinquemani of Slant called it a "tongue-in-cheek smash", writing that "Lovefool" "criminally crowned the band as one-hit wonders in the U.S." Treblezine wrote, "it's not difficult to understand the effect of this song. It's got that certain quality that digs right down into your being and glows with a precise sense of rhythm and pleasure."

"Lovefool" ranked 18th in The Village Voice's 1996 Pazz & Jop poll and 19th the next year. Slant Magazine ranked it 40th on its "100 Best Singles of the 1990s" list, and Pitchfork ranked it 66th on its "Top 200 Tracks of the 1990s" in 2010 and 64th on its "250 Best Songs of the 1990s" in 2022. In 2007, Treblezine ranked the song 50th in its "Top 100 Singles of the '90s". In 2012, Porcys ranked it second on its list of "100 Singles 1990–1999". Billboard ranked "Lovefool" fourth on its list of "The 100 Greatest Pop Songs of 1997" in 2017 and among the "500 Best Pop Songs of All Time" in 2023.

== Music video ==
Three videos were shot for the song. The first was for Europe—"much more bleak, much more our original style", Persson said. "We had an actor playing a sort of handsome-man-love-interest of mine, and he was supposed to be a kind of gangster and the band played his gang members."

The second video was directed by Geoff Moore in New York. It features a man lost on an island and putting a message in a bottle in the water. A woman implied to be his lover is shown on a dock reading a newspaper and at the end of the video receives and reads the message and smiles. The video also shows the band performing the song in what looks to be the interior of the bottle, as well as Persson looking out from the bottle's neck and later through a periscope at the woman. Midway through the song, the band is interviewed by several scuba equipment-wearing reporters who descend from a ladder into the room.

The third video was created to promote Baz Luhrmann's movie Romeo + Juliet. It replaces some scenes with movie clips featuring Leonardo DiCaprio, Claire Danes, and John Leguizamo.

== Track listings ==
=== Original release ===
- European CD single, UK 7-inch and cassette single
1. "Lovefool" – 3:16
2. "Nasty Sunny Beam" – 2:53
- UK, Australasian, and Japanese CD single
1. "Lovefool" – 3:16
2. "Nasty Sunny Beam" – 2:53
3. "Iron Man" (first try) – 3:39

=== Re-release ===
- European CD1
1. "Lovefool" (radio edit) – 3:16
2. "Lovefool" (Tee's's club radio) – 3:21
3. "Lovefool" (Tee's Frozen Sun mix) – 7:50
4. "Lovefool" (Puck version) – 3:14
- European CD2 and UK cassette single
1. "Lovefool" (radio edit) – 3:17
2. "Lovefool" (Tee's club radio) – 3:20
- UK CD1
1. "Lovefool" (radio edit) – 3:17
2. "Lovefool" (Tee's club radio) – 3:21
3. "Lovefool" (Tee's Frozen Sun mix) – 7:50
- UK CD2
1. "Lovefool" (radio edit) – 3:17
2. "Sick & Tired" (live) – 3:34
3. "Carnival" (live) – 3:32
4. "Rise & Shine" (live) – 4:01

== Charts ==
=== Weekly charts ===
Chart (1996)	Peak position
Estonia (Eesti Top 20)	1
Europe (Eurochart Hot 100)	50
Europe Border Breakers (Music & Media)	2
Finland (Suomen virallinen lista)	5
Iceland (Íslenski Listinn Topp 40)	10
Ireland (IRMA)	11
Israel (Israeli Singles Chart)	9
Poland Airplay (Music & Media)	11
Sweden (Sverigetopplistan)	15
Scottish Singles Sales (Official Charts)	22
UK Singles (Official Charts)	21

Chart (1997)	Peak position
Australia (ARIA)	11
Austria (Ö3 Austria Top 40)	7
Belgium (Ultratop 50 Flanders)	16
Belgium (Ultratop 50 Wallonia)	30
Canada Top Singles (RPM)	3
Canada Adult Contemporary (RPM)	12
Canada Rock/Alternative (RPM)	4
Europe (Eurochart Hot 100)	7
France (SNEP)	31
Germany (GfK)	6
Hungary (Mahasz)	5
Ireland (IRMA)	13
Mexico (Notitas Musicales)	1
Netherlands (Dutch Top 40)	24
Netherlands (Single Top 100)	21
New Zealand (Recorded Music NZ)	1
Scottish Singles Sales (Official Charts)	1
Switzerland (Schweizer Hitparade)	22
UK Singles (Official Charts)	2
US Radio Songs (Billboard)	2
US Adult Contemporary (Billboard)	23
US Adult Pop Airplay (Billboard)	2
US Alternative Airplay (Billboard)	9
US Dance Club Songs (Billboard)	5
US Dance Singles Sales (Billboard)	24
US Pop Airplay (Billboard)	1
US Rhythmic Airplay (Billboard)	18

=== Year-end charts ===
Chart (1996)	Position
Iceland (Íslenski Listinn Topp 40)	53
Sweden (Topplistan)	60

Chart (1997)	Position
Australia (ARIA)	52
Brazil Airplay (Crowley)	3
Canada Top Singles (RPM)	31
Canada Adult Contemporary (RPM)	92
Canada Rock/Alternative (RPM)	47
Europe (Eurochart Hot 100)	59
Germany (Media Control)	33
New Zealand (RIANZ)	36
UK Singles (OCC)	31
US Hot 100 Airplay (Billboard)	3
US Adult Top 40 (Billboard)	8
US Modern Rock Tracks (Billboard)	48
US Rhythmic Top 40 (Billboard)	51
US Top 40/Mainstream (Billboard)	4

Chart (2025)	Position
Argentina Anglo Airplay (Monitor Latino)	100

== Certifications ==
Region	Certification	Certified units/sales
Australia (ARIA)	Gold	35,000^{^}
Denmark (IFPI Danmark)	Gold	45,000^{‡}
New Zealand (RMNZ)	2× Platinum	60,000^{‡}
Spain (Promusicae)	Gold	30,000^{‡}
United Kingdom (BPI)	2× Platinum	1,200,000^{‡}
^{^} Shipments figures based on certification alone.^{‡} Sales+streaming figures based on certification alone.

== Release history ==
Region	Date	Format(s)	Label(s)	Ref(s).
Japan	10 August 1996	CD	Polydor; Stockholm	
United States	12 August 1996	College; modern rock; triple A radio	Mercury	
United Kingdom	9 September 1996	7-inch vinyl; CD; cassette	Stockholm; Trampolene	
United Kingdom	21 April 1997	CD; cassette	Polydor; Stockholm; Trampolene	

== Twocolors version ==
"Lovefool"

Single by Twocolors
- Released: 7 May 2020
- Recorded: 2020
- Length: 3:13
- Label: Virgin
- Songwriters: Peter Svensson; Nina Persson

Twocolors singles chronology
"Overload" (2016)	"Lovefool" (2020)	"Bloodstream" (2021)

Music video
- "Lovefool" on YouTube

The German electronic duo Twocolors recorded a cover of the song in 2020. It charted in Germany and many European charts. It topped the charts in Poland and achieved great success in post-Soviet countries, especially Russia. A version featuring American singer Pia Mia was released on 12 November 2020.

=== Charts ===
==== Weekly charts ====
Weekly chart performance for "Lovefool"
Chart (2020)	Peak position
Austria (Ö3 Austria Top 40)	10
Belgium (Ultratip Bubbling Under Wallonia)	9
CIS Airplay (TopHit)	1
Finland (Suomen virallinen lista)	10
France (SNEP)	103
Germany (GfK)	11
Hungary (Rádiós Top 40)	13
Hungary (Single Top 40)	17
Hungary (Stream Top 40)	23
Lithuania (AGATA)	53
Poland Airplay (ZPAV)	1
Poland (Video Chart)	1
Romania (Radiomonitor)	15
Russia Airplay (TopHit)	1
Serbia (Radiomonitor)	16
Slovenia (SloTop50)	5
Slovakia Airplay (ČNS IFPI)	1
Switzerland (Schweizer Hitparade)	16
Ukraine Airplay (TopHit)	1
US Hot Dance/Electronic Songs (Billboard)	17

==== Year-end charts ====
2020 year-end chart performance for "Lovefool"
Chart (2020)	Position
Austria (Ö3 Austria Top 40)	24
CIS (TopHit)	7
Germany (GfK)	28
Hungary (Stream Top 40)	87
Poland (ZPAV)	20
Russia Airplay (TopHit)	10
Switzerland (Schweizer Hitparade)	48
US Hot Dance/Electronic Songs (Billboard)	97

2021 year-end chart performance for "Lovefool"
Chart (2021)	Position
Germany (GfK)	69
Hungary (Rádiós Top 40)	73
Hungary (Stream Top 40)	56
Poland (ZPAV)	58
US Hot Dance/Electronic Songs (Billboard)	61

2022 year-end chart performance for "Lovefool"
Chart (2022)	Position
Russia Airplay (TopHit)	154
Ukraine Airplay (TopHit)	60

=== Certifications ===
Region	Certification	Certified units/sales
Australia (ARIA)	Gold	35,000^{‡}
Austria (IFPI Austria)	2× Platinum	60,000^{‡}
Brazil (Pro-Música Brasil)	3× Platinum	120,000^{‡}
Canada (Music Canada)	Platinum	80,000^{‡}
France (SNEP)	Platinum	200,000^{‡}
Germany (BVMI)	3× Gold	600,000^{‡}
Italy (FIMI)	Gold	35,000^{‡}
Poland (ZPAV)	3× Platinum	150,000^{‡}
Portugal (AFP)	Gold	5,000^{‡}
Spain (Promusicae)	Gold	30,000^{‡}
Switzerland (IFPI Switzerland)	2× Platinum	40,000^{‡}
United Kingdom (BPI)	Silver	200,000^{‡}
United States (RIAA)	Gold	500,000^{‡}
^{‡} Sales+streaming figures based on certification alone.

== Other cover versions ==
- American actress and singer Leighton Meester performed a version of the song in June 2015 for The A.V. Club's A.V. Undercover series.
- In 2010, Japanese pop trio Perfume teamed up with Pepsi for a Pepsi NEX commercial in Japan, performing a stylized cover produced by Yasutaka Nakata. The full version never saw an official release, making it a unique, one-off tie-in with the commercial.
- Japanese pop singer Dream Ami has recorded a cover of the song.
- Musical collective Postmodern Jukebox recorded a cover in the style of Frank Sinatra and big band music.
- Bad Suns covered "Lovefool" in the style of psychedelic and funk influences after first playing it live during their tour performances.
- American punk rock band New Found Glory covered "Lovefool" for their 2007 album From the Screen to Your Stereo Part II.

=== Samplings ===
- Justin Bieber interpolated the chorus in his 2009 song "Love Me".
- Claire Rosinkranz interpolated the chorus in her 2021 single "Frankenstein".
- Sabrina Carpenter performed a mashup of her 2023 song "Feather" with the song's chorus sampled and sung in her performance on Weekend 2 of Coachella 2024 at the Empire Polo Club in Indio, California.
- K-pop girl group IVE interpolated the chorus in their 2023 song "Off the Record".
- K-pop girl group AtHeart reimagined the song in their 2026 song "Say It".
