= The Cardigans =

Swedish rock band

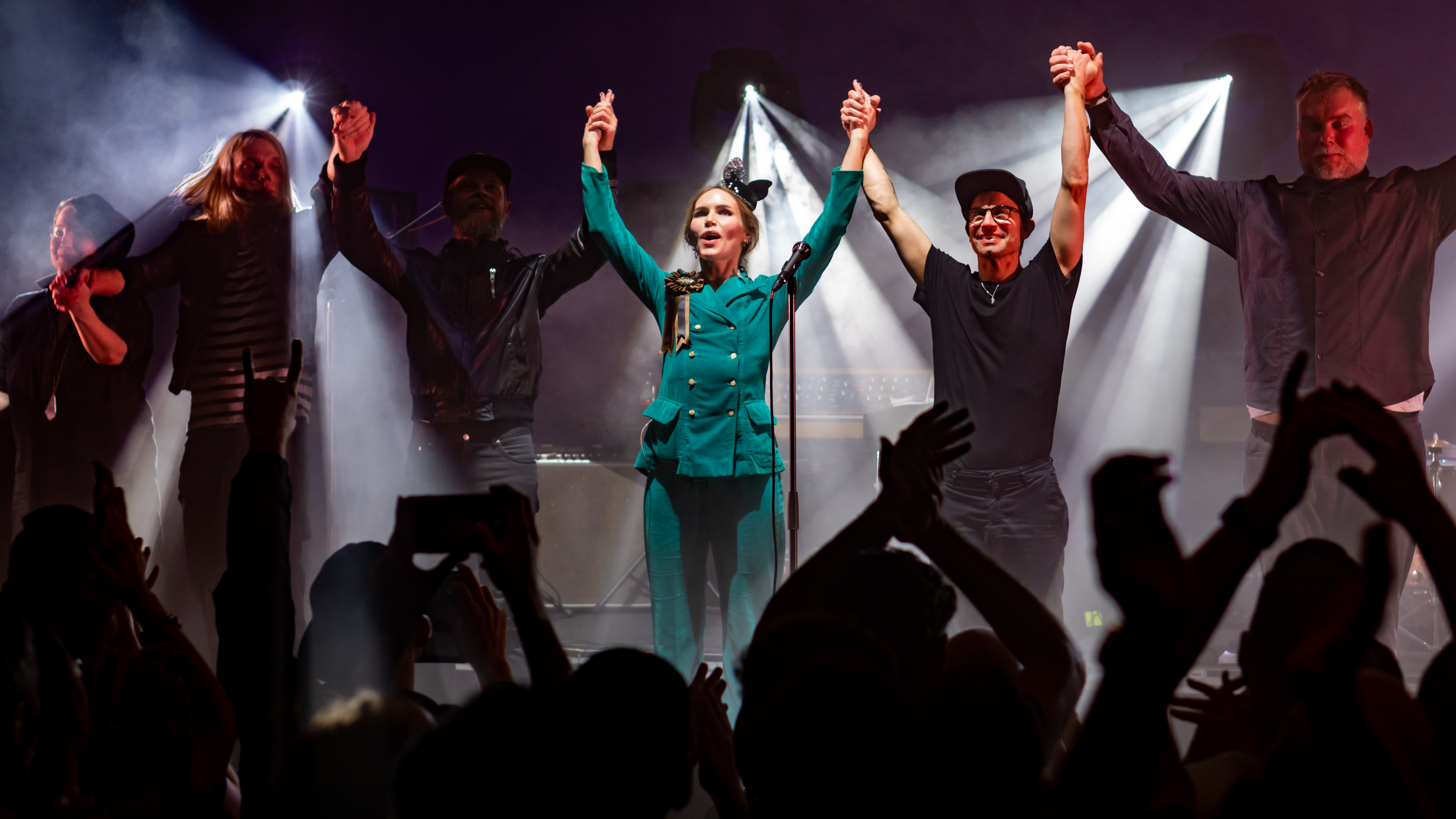
- The Cardigans performing in December 2018

Background information
- Origin: Jönköping, Småland, Sweden
- Genres: Alternative rock; pop rock; indie rock; indie pop
- Years active: 1992–2006, 2012–present
- Labels: MCA, Mercury, Minty Fresh, Stockholm, Universal
- Members: Lars-Olof Johansson; Bengt Lagerberg; Nina Persson; Magnus Sveningsson
- Past members: Peter Svensson; Mattias Alfheim
- Website: www.cardigans.com

The Cardigans are a Swedish rock band formed in Jönköping, Sweden in 1992. The main lineup of the band consisted of guitarist Peter Svensson, bassist Magnus Sveningsson, drummer Bengt Lagerberg, keyboardist Lars-Olof Johansson and lead singer Nina Persson. Since 2012, the band’s performances have been with Oskar Humlebo on guitar instead of Svensson.

With their debut album, Emmerdale (1994), they gained a solid base in their home country and enjoyed some success abroad, especially in Japan. Their second album, Life (1995), secured them an international reputation. Their popularity rose when their single "Lovefool", from the album First Band on the Moon (1996), was included in the soundtrack to the 1996 film Romeo + Juliet. Other singles included "Erase/Rewind" and "My Favourite Game" from the album Gran Turismo (1998). After a two-year hiatus the band returned to recording, and released their fifth album, Long Gone Before Daylight (2003), a mellower country-flavoured record. Their latest album, as of July 2024, is Super Extra Gravity (2005). After a 2006 tour, the band took a five-year break from musical activities before reuniting in 2012. They have sold over 15 million albums worldwide.

== History ==
=== First years: 1992–1994 ===
Peter Svensson and Magnus Sveningsson, both heavy metal musicians, formed the group on 31 October 1992 in Jönköping, Sweden, with drummer Bengt Lagerberg, guitarist Mattias Alfheim and lead singer Nina Persson. The band's name was suggested by Svensson as the band were "super anglophiles" and wanted to "romanticise something sort of rainy and hazy and woolly...like the cardigan."

Living together in a small apartment, the Cardigans recorded a demo tape with Persson providing lead vocals on only one of the songs towards the end of the track list. A&R man Ola Hermanson heard the demo and signed the band to his Trampolene imprint. While recording their first album in 1993, Alfheim left and was replaced by Lagerberg's friend, Lars-Olof Johansson, who remained in the band ever since.

They released their debut album, Emmerdale, in Sweden and Japan in 1994; it was re-released internationally in 1997. The album included the Swedish radio hit "Rise & Shine", which was later voted the best of 1994 in a poll in Slitz magazine.

=== Commercial success: 1995–2000 ===
The remainder of 1994 was spent touring Europe and recording Life, which was released worldwide in 1995. Life became an international success, selling more than a million copies and achieving platinum status in Japan. In 1996, Life was released under the label Minty Fresh in the US, but this release was essentially a compilation of tracks from Emmerdale and Life.

After their success with Life, the Cardigans signed with Mercury Records, under which they released First Band on the Moon worldwide in 1996. "Lovefool" was a hit worldwide, particularly in the US and Japan, where the album reached platinum status in three weeks. The album also achieved gold sales status in the US. "Lovefool" was shown on MTV in the late 1990s as a music video with clips from the 1996 hit film Romeo + Juliet starring Leonardo DiCaprio and Claire Danes. It was also featured in the film Cruel Intentions (1999).

In 1997, the band played themselves in an episode of Beverly Hills, 90210 as the featured entertainment at their college graduation party, hosted by Kelly Taylor's dad. The band performed "Lovefool" and "Been It." Their song "Carnival" was featured in the 1997 film Austin Powers: International Man of Mystery. The band was also asked to submit the theme song for the James Bond film Tomorrow Never Dies but rejected the request due to exhaustion that would be exacerbated by the potential added workload; Persson has called her decision to turn down the offer "one of my biggest mistakes."

1998's Gran Turismo was followed by a long hiatus during which the band members pursued solo side projects. The same year they also released a compilation album of rare B-sides, The Other Side of the Moon as a Japan-only release. The video of the song "My Favourite Game" was censored by MTV for showing reckless driving. Despite this, it went on to become their second global hit song. "My Favourite Game" was featured on the soundtrack of the PlayStation video game Gran Turismo 2 in the intro movie on CD1. That year also saw their song "Deuce" appearing on The X-Files: The Album. Their song "Erase/Rewind" was featured in the 1999 films Never Been Kissed and The Thirteenth Floor. In 2018, German author Thorsten Nagelschmidt published a book titled Der Abfall der Herzen, a reference to the band's song "Junk of the Hearts" featured on Gran Turismo.

In 1999, the Cardigans recorded a duet cover of Talking Heads' "Burning Down the House" with Tom Jones for his album Reload.

=== Back to spotlight and hiatus: 2002–2006 ===
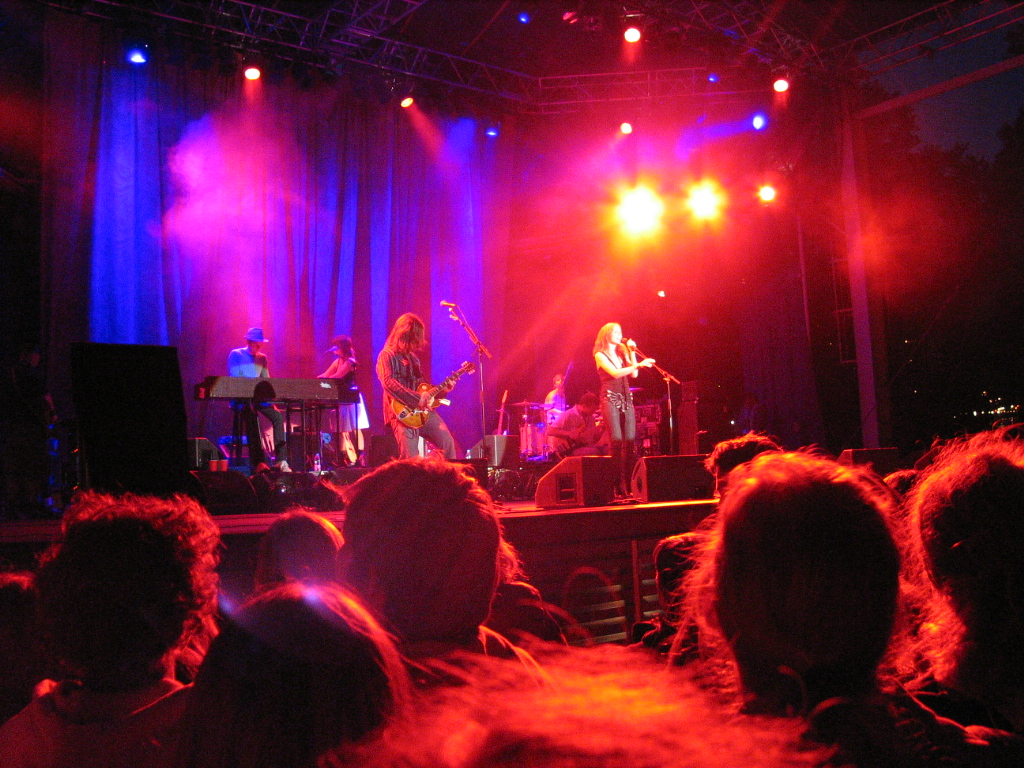
The Cardigans performing in June 2004.

The Cardigans returned in 2002 to record Long Gone Before Daylight (2003), a collection of songs mainly written by Persson and Svensson. Long Gone Before Daylight became one of the best selling albums in Sweden in 2003. After a two-year hiatus from their last album, it was released in Japan on 19 March 2003 and in Europe on 24 March 2003. Later it was also released in Canada (22 April 2003) and the United States (25 May 2004).

The album differs from the band's earlier works. Their familiar "happy" pop sound takes on a change to pop songs with more of an American country music influence. It is a much darker album than their previous works, and quieter than Gran Turismo. Indeed, even lead singer Nina Persson dyed her once light blonde hair to jet black, reflecting the band's change of mood. The album was produced by Per Sunding after the group's regular producer Tore Johanssen stepped down, feeling himself unable to provide the country sound the group wanted.

Criticism was generally mixed. Some found the change of direction welcome, and felt the band had matured, making songs that were even better than other experienced country-pop styled artists. Others missed the old pop sound, and accused the band of possibly being ashamed of their former "happy" pop sound. The first single of the album, "For What It's Worth" was released on 17 February 2003. The second single was "You're the Storm" released on 2 June 2003. The third and final single was "Live and Learn" released on 3 December 2003. In the summer of 2004, the Cardigans toured with Liz Phair, Katy Rose and Charlotte Martin on the Chicks With Attitude tour.

On 28 April 2005, the band's iTunes Originals album was released through iTunes. On 19 October 2005, the band released their sixth album, Super Extra Gravity, to generally favourable reviews. Super Extra Gravity went straight to the No. 1 spot on the Swedish album chart and was certified gold (sales over 40,000). After the band finished promotional activities in Autumn 2006, the band entered an extended hiatus and devoted themselves to other projects.

=== Reunion, touring and future: 2012–present ===
In 2012, the Cardigans received a lucrative offer from Hultsfred Festival to perform the album Gran Turismo in full. After initial hesitation, the band decided to accept the offer "as it felt like a good way of tearing us out of our strange new everyday life," according to Persson. Peter Svensson declined to participate, although he had no objection to the band touring without him. They recruited singer-songwriter Oskar Humlebo to fill in for Svensson, and asked their agent to seek more shows for them to play. Ultimately, the band made their live comeback with shows in Lund and Copenhagen ahead of Hultsfred, before playing in Poland, Finland, Russia, Indonesia, Taiwan and Japan, with a scheduled concert in Israel cancelled by the promoter. Most of these shows involved performing Gran Turismo in full, followed by an assortment of hits from their other albums.

Still with Humlebo in place of Svensson, the band played career-spanning sets when touring resumed during late 2013 with shows in Japan, China and Russia, followed by more dates in 2015 which took them to South Korea, Europe and Latin America. In interviews promoting her 2014 solo album Animal Heart, Persson suggested that the success of their most recent live dates opened the possibility for future Cardigans recordings, though there were no firm plans. "It's really fun to do greatest hits things, since there's nothing else, but I think if we continue having this much fun we would like to make another record, because we like to create new things," said Persson. The band's only scheduled show for 2016 was at Qstock (Oulu, Finland) on 29 July. In 2017, they performed in Stockholm, in Turku, and at the Yammatovo 3 festival in Croatia.

In June 2018, the band announced their only live shows of the year: a four-date UK tour in December to celebrate the 20th anniversary of Gran Turismo in which they would perform the album in full again. In an interview to promote the tour, Persson stated, "There won't be any more Cardigans records, I'm pretty sure. But we'll keep doing little tours and shows as long as it's fun, as long as we can do it well and feel that it's something that's current to us."

In May 2023, Persson confirmed Svensson would never rejoin the band, and that as a result there would be no new Cardigans albums. The idea of making new music without Svensson was ruled out as well. The band keeps on touring sporadically.

On 6 September 2024, the band released the two-volume B-sides compilation The Rest of the Best.

Persson told The Guardian in February 2026 why the band had not made any new music since Super Extra Gravity: "We were on a roll making that album and in our enthusiasm decided to make another right away. Then I started to hesitate … Throwing myself into another album and tour cycle would make me another two or three years later in trying to start a family. I said, “Actually, let’s have some time off.” Then I had to go through the cancer as well and we just dropped the ball. The main songwriter eventually lost patience, but the rest of us were excited to keep playing live. Now we have logistics issues – families, day jobs – but do toy with the idea of making new music, whether as the Cardigans or in a different form. We’re all capable of making great music and lately it’s been inspiring to see people like Suede from the 90s making new material. It’s not cringey middle-aged dudes looking hard in leather jackets. It’s really good stuff."

== Solo projects ==
During the band's first break Nina Persson released an album as A Camp, and Peter Svensson and Bengt Lagerberg worked on the project Paus with help from Joakim Berg from Kent, and Magnus Sveningsson recorded as Righteous Boy.

In 2006, Sveningsson restarted their old label Trampolene and became an A&R for it. The first signing was the Swedish popband The Animal Five, which was a minor success in Sweden and Germany.

Lagerberg and Johansson formed the group Brothers Of End, releasing a debut album, The End, in 2009, and a second album, Mount Inside, in 2011. A third album, Shakers Love, was released in 2014, and Nina Persson appeared on the track "Heat".

In November 2006, Persson featured on The Cake Sale, an album set up by Oxfam Ireland. It contained nine tracks from some of Ireland's leading artists. Proceeds from the album went to the fair trade campaign.

Persson also appeared on the Manic Street Preachers' album Send Away the Tigers (May 2007), providing guest vocals on the UK Chart No. 2 single "Your Love Alone Is Not Enough". She shared vocals with Manics frontman James Dean Bradfield, who also appeared on stage with the band at the Glastonbury Festival 2007, and who has rated Peter Svensson as his second favourite guitarist.

In the band's break of 2007, Persson recorded the second A Camp album Colonia, which was released in early 2009. A Camp supported the US release of Colonia with a tour, which began in New York City on 26 May and completed on 15 June in Los Angeles.

In 2010, Persson appeared on Danger Mouse & Sparklehorse's collaboration (Dark Night of the Soul) singing "Daddy's Gone" (with Mark Linkous).

Persson released the album Animal Heart under her own name in 2014.

== Band members ==
Current members

- Lars-Olof Johansson – keyboards, guitar, backing vocals (1993–2006, 2012–present)
- Bengt Lagerberg – drums (1992–2006, 2012–present)
- Nina Persson – vocals (1992–2006, 2012–present)
- Magnus Sveningsson – bass, backing vocals (1992–2006, 2012–present)

Current touring members

- Oskar Humlebo – lead guitar, backing vocals (2012–present)

Former members

- Peter Svensson – lead guitar, backing vocals (1992–2006, on hiatus since 2012)
- Mattias Alfheim - guitar (1992–1993)

Former touring members

- Lars Ljungberg – bass guitar (1998–1999)

== Discography ==
Studio albums

- Emmerdale (1994)
- Life (1995)
- First Band on the Moon (1996)
- Gran Turismo (1998)
- Long Gone Before Daylight (2003)
- Super Extra Gravity (2005)

== Awards and nominations ==
BMI Pop Awards

Year	Nominee / work	Award	Result
1999	"Lovefool"	Award-Winning Song	Won

Billboard Music Awards

Year	Nominee / work	Award	Result
1997	"Lovefool"	Top Hot 100 Airplay Track	Nominated

Billboard Music Video Awards

Year	Nominee / work	Award	Result
1997	"Lovefool"	Pop/Rock Clip of the Year	Nominated

Brit Awards

Year	Nominee / work	Award	Result
2000	Themselves	Best International Group	Nominated

Danish Music Awards

Year	Nominee / work	Award	Result
2000	Gran Turismo	Foreign Album of the Year	Won

Denmark GAFFA Awards

Year	Nominee / work	Award	Result	Ref.
1998	"My Favourite Game"	Best Foreign Video	Nominated	
1998	"My Favourite Game"	Best Foreign Hit	Nominated	
1999	"Burning Down the House" (with Tom Jones)	Best Foreign Hit	Nominated	
2005	Nina Persson	Best Foreign Female Act	Nominated	

Grammis

Year	Nominee / work	Award	Result
1995	Themselves	Best Pop Group	Nominated
1997	Themselves	Best Pop Group	Won
1997	Themselves	Best Artist	Nominated
1997	First Band on the Moon	Best Album	Nominated
1997	"Lovefool"	Best Song	Nominated
1999	Themselves	Best Pop Group	Won
1999	Themselves	Best Artist	Nominated
1999	Gran Turismo	Best Album	Won
1999	"My Favourite Game"	Best Song	Nominated
1999	"My Favourite Game"	Best Music Video	Nominated
2004	Long Gone Before Daylight	Best Album	Won
2004	Themselves	Best Rock Group	Won
2006	Themselves	Best Rock Group	Nominated

MTV Europe Music Awards

Year	Nominee / work	Award	Result
1996	Themselves	Best New Act	Nominated
1997	"Lovefool"	Best Song	Nominated
1999	Themselves	Best Group	Nominated
1999	Themselves	Best Rock	Nominated
1999	Themselves	Best Nordic Act	Nominated
2003	Themselves	Best Nordic Act	Nominated

Musikexportpriset

Year	Nominee / work	Award	Result	Ref.
1997	Themselves	Music Export Award	Won	

Rockbjornen

Year	Nominee / work	Award	Result
1998	Themselves	Best Swedish Band	Won

Smash Hits Poll Winners Party

Year	Nominee / work	Award	Result	Ref.
1996	Themselves	Best International Band	Nominated	

TMF Awards

Year	Nominee / work	Award	Result
1999	"My Favourite Game"	Best Video International	Won

Žebřík Music Awards

Year	Nominee / work	Award	Result	Ref.
1998	"My Favourite Game"	Best International Video	Nominated	

== See also ==
- Swedish music abroad
- List of HFStival acts
- Swedish indie pop
- Swedish rock
