= Magnus Sveningsson =

Swedish musician

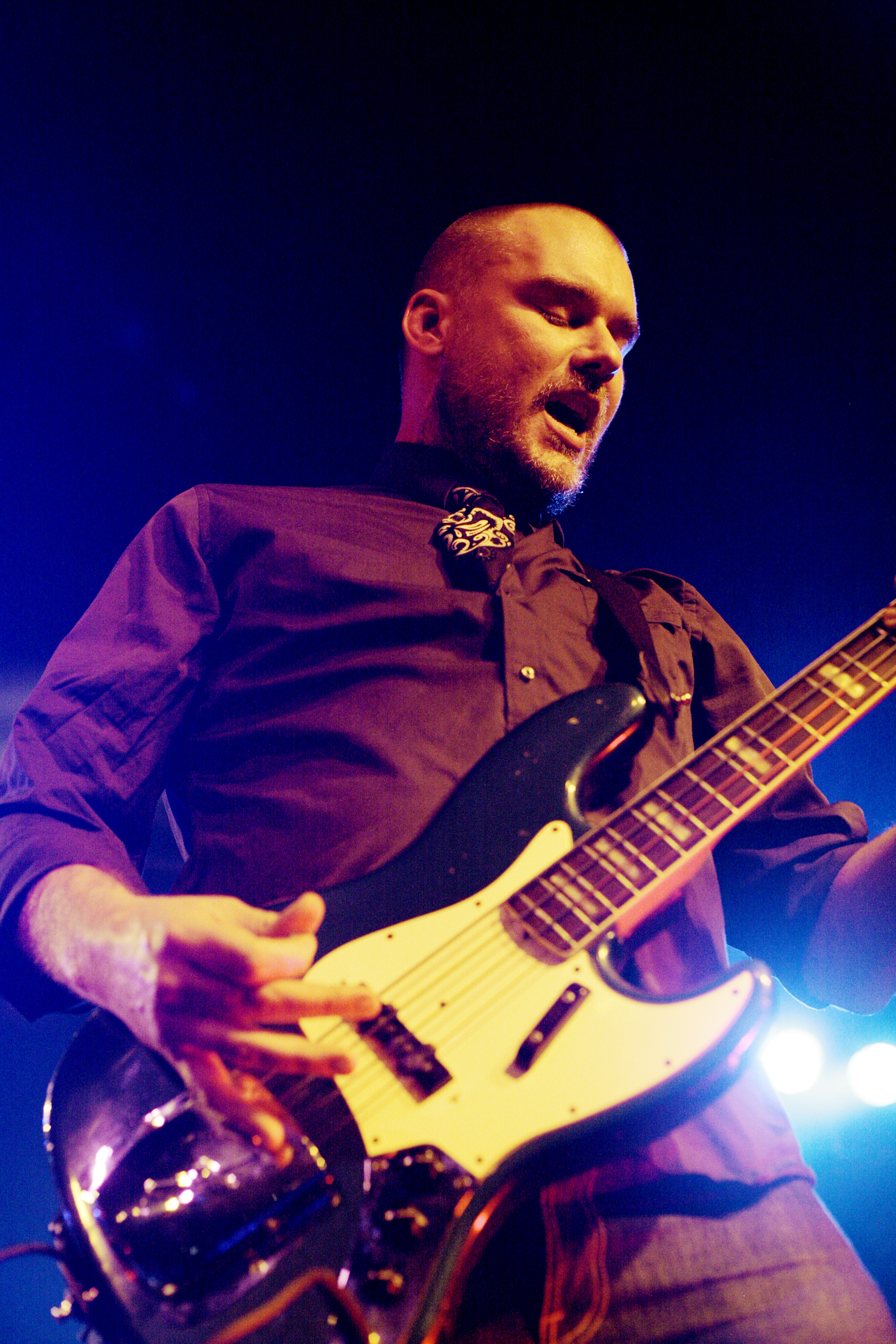
- Sveningsson in 2006

Background information
- Also known as: Righteous Boy
- Born: Johan Magnus Sveningsson; 4 April 1972 (age 54); Falköping, Sweden
- Genres: Pop rock, indie rock
- Occupations: singer-songwriter, bassist
- Instrument: Bass
- Labels: Stockholm, Universal
- Member of: The Cardigans
- Website: www.cardigans.com

Magnus Sveningsson (born Johan Magnus Sveningsson on 4 April 1972) is a musician and singer-songwriter. He is best known as the bassist in the Swedish rock band The Cardigans.

Sveningsson was born in Falköping.

In addition to The Cardigans, he recorded the solo project I Sing Because of You under the name Righteous Boy.

In 2006, he restarted The Cardigans' former record label, Trampolene. As an underlabel to Universal they signed the Swedish band, The Animal Five, who reached some popularity in both Sweden and Germany.

== Solo discography ==
- I Sing Because of You (2002)
