= Bonnie Pink discography =

Discography of Japanese pop singer Bonnie Pink

- Studio albums: 13
- EPs: 2
- Soundtrack albums: 1
- Live albums: 1
- Compilation albums: 4
- Tribute albums: 2
- Singles: 42
- Video albums: 5
- Remix albums: 1

The discography of Japanese pop singer Bonnie Pink consists of thirteen studio albums, four compilation albums, one live album, two extended plays one soundtrack and forty-two singles.

== Studio albums ==
List of studio albums, with selected chart positions and sales
Title	Album details	Peak positions	Sales (JPN) (Note: Sales provided by Oricon database and are rounded to the nearest thousand copies.)	Certifications
Title	Album details	JPN	Sales (JPN)	Certifications
Blue Jam	Released: September 21, 1995 (JPN); Label: Love Lite / Stone Fox; Formats: CD, digital download	—		
Heaven's Kitchen	Released: May 16, 1997 (JPN); Label: Love Lite / Stone Fox; Formats: CD, digital download	8	304,000	RIAJ: Platinum
Evil and Flowers	Released: March 17, 1998 (JPN); Label: Stone Fox; Formats: CD, digital download	4	256,000	RIAJ: Gold
Let Go	Released: April 5, 2000 (JPN); Label: East West Japan; Formats: CD, digital download	10	83,000	
Just a Girl	Released: October 24, 2001 (JPN); Label: East West Japan; Formats: CD, digital download	11	46,000	
Present	Released: February 19, 2003 (JPN); Label: Organon; Formats: CD, digital download	8	65,000	
Even So	Released: May 12, 2004 (JPN); Label: Warner Music Japan; Formats: CD, digital download	5	77,000	
Golden Tears	Released: September 21, 2005 (JPN); Label: Warner; Formats: CD, digital download	12	42,000	
Thinking Out Loud	Released: July 25, 2007 (JPN); Label: Warner; Formats: CD, CD/DVD, digital download	5	98,000	RIAJ: Gold
One	Released: May 13, 2009 (JPN); Label: Warner; Formats: CD, CD/DVD, digital download	5	37,000	
Dear Diary	Released: October 6, 2010 (JPN); Label: Warner; Formats: CD, 2CD/DVD, digital download	7	21,000	
Chasing Hope	Released: July 25, 2012 (JPN); Label: Warner; Formats: CD, CD/DVD, digital download	15	10,000	
Infinity	Released: September 6, 2023; Label: Warner; Formats: CD, digital download	49	1,134	
"—" denotes items that did not chart.

== Compilation albums ==
List of albums, with selected chart positions
Title	Album details	Peak positions	Sales (JPN)	Certifications
Title	Album details	JPN	Sales (JPN)	Certifications
Bonnie's Kitchen #1	Released: December 17, 1999 (JPN); Label: Stone Fox; Formats: CD, digital download	13	79,000	
Bonnie's Kitchen #2	Released: January 19, 2000 (JPN); Label: Stone Fox; Formats: CD, digital download	18	29,000	
Every Single Day: Complete Bonnie Pink (1995–2006)	Released: July 26, 2006 (JPN); Label: Warner; Formats: 2CD, 2CD/DVD, digital download	2	500,000	RIAJ: 2× Platinum
Bonnie Pink All Time Best "Grow"	Released: August 26, 2026 (JPN); Label: Warner; Formats: 2CD, digital download	37	1,493	

== Cover and remake albums ==
List of albums, with selected chart positions
Title	Album details	Peak positions	Sales (JPN)
Title	Album details	JPN	Sales (JPN)
Reminiscence	Released: June 22, 2005 (JPN); Label: Warner; Formats: CD, digital download	18	36,000
Back Room: Bonnie Pink Remakes	Released: September 21, 2011 (JPN); Label: Warner; Formats: CD, CD/DVD, digital download	17	9,000

== Extended plays ==
List of albums, with selected chart positions
Title	Album details	Peak positions	Sales (JPN)
Title	Album details	JPN	Sales (JPN)
E.P.	Released: May 20, 1998 (JPN); Label: Stone Fox; Formats: Vinyl	—	
Chain	Released: November 26, 2008 (JPN); Label: Warner; Formats: CD, digital download	41	10,000

== Soundtrack ==
List of albums, with selected chart positions
Title	Album details
Lie Lie Lie featuring Bonnie Pink	Soundtrack for the film Lie Lie Lie, also featuring compositions by composer Ryo Yoshimata; Released: September 19, 1997 (JPN); Label: Love Lite / Stone Fox; Formats: CD, digital download

== Remix albums ==
List of albums, with selected chart positions
Title	Album details	Peak positions	Sales (JPN)
Title	Album details	JPN	Sales (JPN)
Re-Pink: Bonnie Pink Remixes	Released: February 27, 2002 (JPN); Label: WEA / Organon; Formats: CD, digital download	68	4,000

== Live albums ==
List of albums, with selected chart positions
Title	Album details	Peak positions	Sales (JPN)
Title	Album details	JPN	Sales (JPN)
Pink in Red	Released: August 6, 2003 (JPN); Label: Pinxter; Formats: CD, digital download	90	5,000

== Singles ==
=== As a lead artist ===
List of singles, with selected chart positions
Title	Year	Peak chart positions		Sales (JPN)	Certifications	Album
Title	Year	Oricon Singles Charts	Billboard Japan Hot 100 (Note: Sources for chart positions are as follows: "A Perfect Sky", "Kane o Narashite", "Waratte Misete Kure", "Chain", "All the Way", "Joy", "Fuchsia Fuchsia Fuchsia", "Morning Glory", "Is This Love?", "Kite", "Look Me in the Eyes", "All You Need Is Love", "Tsumetai Ame", "Machi no Namae", "Twinkle of My Eyes", "Hey Tagger, I'm Here", "Koromogae".)	Sales (JPN)	Certifications	Album
"Orange" (オレンジ, Orenji)	1995	—	— (Note: Charted at number 98 on the Adult Contemporary Airplay chart in 2014.)			Blue Jam
"Surprise!"	1996	—	—			Non-album single
"Do You Crash?"	1996	—	—			Heaven's Kitchen
"Heaven's Kitchen"	1997	50	—	47,000		Heaven's Kitchen
"It's Gonna Rain!"	1997	40	—	26,000		Heaven's Kitchen
"Forget Me Not"	1998	48	—	31,000		Evil and Flowers
"Kingyo" (金魚; "Goldfish")	1998	—	—			Evil and Flowers
"Inu to Tsuki" (犬と月; "A Dog and the Moon")	1998	15	—	70,000		Bonnie's Kitchen 1
"Daisy"	1999	10	—	58,000		Non-album single
"You Are Blue, So Am I"	2000	24	—	20,000		Let Go
"Kako to Genjitsu" (過去と現実; "The Past and Reality")	2000	80	—	2,000		Let Go
"Sleeping Child"	2000	—	—			Let Go
"Take Me In"	2001	30	—	16,000		Just a Girl
"Thinking of You"	2001	28	—	21,000		Just a Girl
"Nemurenai Yoru" (眠れない夜; "Sleepless Nights")	2001	56	—	6,000		Just a Girl
"Tonight, the Night"	2003	29	—	21,000		Present
"Private Laughter"	2004	30	—	12,000		Even So
"Last Kiss"	2004	24	—	13,000		Even So
"So Wonderful"	2005	46	—	7,000		Golden Tears
"Love Is Bubble"	2006	28	—	14,000		Every Single Day
"A Perfect Sky"	2006	5	67 (Note: Charted in 2008.)	133,000	RIAJ (ringtone): Million; RIAJ (digital): 2× Platinum; RIAJ (physical): Gold	Every Single Day / Thinking Out Loud
"Anything for You"	2007	9	—	26,000		Thinking Out Loud
"Water Me"	2007	8	—	33,000	RIAJ (digital): Gold	Thinking Out Loud
"Ring a Bell" / "Kane o Narashite" (鐘を鳴らして)	2008	9	3	33,000	RIAJ (digital): Platinum	One
"Joy"	2009	24	17	5,000		One
"Happy Ending"	2009	24	—	5,000		One
"Morning Glory"	2010	—	17			Dear Diary
"Is This Love?"	2010	—	28			Dear Diary
"Kite" (カイト, Kaito)	2010	47	6	3,000		Dear Diary
"Tsumetai Ame" (冷たい雨; "Chilly Rain")	2012	26	7	5,000		Chasing Hope
"Machi no Namae" (街の名前; "Town Name")	2012	61	11	1,000		Chasing Hope
"Spin Big"	2015	—	— (Note: Charted at number 30 on the Radio Songs sub-chart.)			Non-album singles
"We Belong"	2016	—	—			Non-album singles
"—" denotes items that did not chart, or were released before the creation of the Billboard Japan Hot 100 in 2008.

=== As a featured artist ===
List of singles, with selected chart positions
Title	Year	Peak chart positions		Sales (JPN)	Album
Title	Year	Oricon Singles Charts	Billboard Japan Hot 100	Sales (JPN)	Album
"Get Out!" (DJ Hasebe featuring Bonnie Pink & Verbal)	2002	49	—	9,000	Tail of Old Nick
"Red Hot Shoes" (DJ Hasebe featuring Bonnie Pink)	2002	49	—	9,000	Tail of Old Nick
"Under the Sun" (Atami featuring Bonnie Pink)	2002	—	—		Doppler
"Above the Clouds" (Meister featuring Bonnie Pink)	2004	—	—		Non-album single
"Love Song" (M-Flo loves Bonnie Pink)	2006	9	—	25,000	Cosmicolor
"Waratte Misete Kure" (笑ってみせてくれ; "Try Laughing for Me") (among Band for "Sanka")	2008	35	82	6,000	Non-album single
"All the Way" (Craig David featuring Bonnie Pink)	2008	—	68		Greatest Hits
"All You Need Is Love" (among Japan United with Music)	2012	11	11	26,000	Non-album single
"Twinkle of My Eyes" (Q;indivi+Bonnie Pink)	2013	—	61		Non-album single
"Hey Tagger, I'm Here" (Soil & "Pimp" Sessions featuring Bonnie Pink)	2013	—	84		Circles
"Koromogae" (衣替え; "Seasonal Wardrobe Change") (Tofubeats featuring Bonnie Pink)	2014	—	76		First Album
"Yameta!!!" ("Stopped!!!") (Rake featuring Bonnie Pink)	2014	217	— (Note: Charted at number 11 on the Billboard Japan Adult Contemporary Airplay chart, and at number 52 on the Hot Top Airplay chart.)	400	Hajimari no Machi
"Little Bit Better" (Zeus featuring Bonnie Pink)	2020	—	—		Zeus
"Wonderland" (Night Tempo featuring Bonnie Pink)	2021	—	—		Ladies in the City
"—" denotes items that did not chart, or were released before the creation of the Billboard Japan Hot 100 in 2008.

=== Promotional singles ===
List of promotional singles with selected chart positions
Title	Year	Peak chart positions	Album
Title	Year	Billboard Japan Hot 100	Album
"We've Gotta Find a Way Back to Love"	1996	—	"Surprise!" (single)
"Lie Lie Lie"	1997	—	Heaven's Kitchen / Lie Lie Lie featuring Bonnie Pink
"Fish"	2000	—	Let Go
"Got Me a Feeling" (with DJ Mitsu the Beats and Ken Hirai)	2005	—	Reminiscence
"Don't Get Me Wrong" (with The Miceteeth)	2005	—	Reminiscence
"Gimme a Beat"	2007	—	Thinking Out Loud
"Chain"	2008	14	Chain
"Fed Up" (featuring Craig David)	2009	—	One
"Fuchsia Fuchsia Fuchsia" (フューシャ フューシャ フューシャ, Fyūsha Fyūsha Fyūsha)	2009	52	One
"The Sun Will Rise Again"	2011	—	Non-album single
"Look Me in the Eyes"	2011	68	Back Room
"—" denotes items that did not chart, or were released before the creation of the Billboard Japan Hot 100 in 2008.

== Other appearances ==
List of non-studio album or guest appearances that feature Bonnie Pink
Title	Year	Album
"4 Seasons Lover" (Note: Featured in chorus.) (Boogie Man)	1994	Pachiko Man
"Freedom"	1994	Ladies in Motion (Note: Billed as Kaori Asada.)
"Crazy Flight"	1994	Ladies in Motion
"The Microphone Song" (Poetized)	1996	E.P.
"Sugary Man" (シュガリー・マン) (Cokeberry featuring Bonnie Pink)	1996	Sugar Plum Fairy
"Plastic Dummy" (プラスティック・ダミー) (World Famous featuring Bonnie Pink)	1996	Summer
"Blackbird" (George Martin featuring Bonnie Pink)	1998	In My Life (Japanese Edition)
"Windy Lady" (Moomin)	1998	"Feel Alright!" (single)
"Ishi to Tamago" (石と卵; "Stone and Egg") (Motoharu Sano featuring Bonnie Pink)	2000	Grass: The 20th Anniversary Edition's 2nd
"Akai Sweet Pea" (赤いスイートピー; "Red Sweet Pea") (What's Love? featuring Bonnie Pink)	2001	"Koi no Aji" (single)
"The Origin of Love"	2004	Hedwig and the Angry Inch Tribute
"Please Mr. Postman @ Boy'sroom"	2004	Kamachi Original Soundtrack
"Please Mr. Postman @ Laidback"	2004	Kamachi Original Soundtrack
"You Are the No. 1 (Hey DJ)" (Kreva featuring Bonnie Pink)	2004	Shinjin Kreva
"Tokyo Girl" (Honesty featuring Bonnie Pink)	2005	American Rock
"Revolution"	2005	Happy Birthday, John
"A World Without Love" (Fantastic Plastic Machine featuring Bonnie Pink)	2006	Imaginations (Fantastic Plastic Machine album)
"Kimi-tachi Kiwi Papaya Manga da ne" (君たちキゥイ・パパイア・マンゴーだね; "You Guys Are Kiwi, Papaya and Mango, Right?") (Bonnie Pink meets Mansfield)	2006	Words of Yukinojo
"Ningyo" (人魚; "Mermaid")	2007	Kyohei Tsutsumi Tribute: The Popular Music
"Hanasaka Fever" (花さかフィーバー; "Flower Hill Fever") (Ulfuls featuring Bonnie Pink, Shiho (Superfly))	2007	"Ryōhō for You" (single) / Keen On, Move On
"Spilt Milk" (Curly Giraffe featuring Bonnie Pink)	2009	Thank You for Being a Friend EP / Thank You for Being a Friend
"Corona & Lime" (コロナ & ライム) (Gagle featuring Bonnie Pink)	2009	Slow But Steady
"Run Run Run" (Curly Giraffe featuring Bonnie Pink)	2009	Thank You for Being a Friend
"Be There" (Ohashi Trio featuring Bonnie Pink)	2011	L
"Time Will Tell" (Tofubeats featuring Bonnie Pink)	2014	Utada Hikaru no Uta

== Video albums ==
List of media, with selected chart positions
Title	Album details	Peak positions
Title	Album details	JPN DVD
B.P.V. Vol. 1 (1995–1998)	Released: February 20, 2000 (JPN); Label: Pony Canyon; Formats: DVD	—
B.P.V. Vol. 2 (1999–2003)	Released: February 26, 2003 (JPN); Label: Organon; Formats: DVD	64
Bonnie Pink Goes Overseas	Released: September 21, 2005 (JPN); Label: Pinxter; Formats: DVD	126
Tour 2005: Golden Tears	Released: August 23, 2006 (JPN); Label: Warner Music Vision; Formats: DVD	47
Tour 2007: Thinking Out Loud Final at Nippon Budokan	Released: April 9, 2008 (JPN); Label: Warner Music Vision; Formats: DVD	29
