= Every Single Day: Complete Bonnie Pink (1995–2006) =

Greatest hits album by Bonnie Pink
- Released: July 26, 2006
- Recorded: 1996–2006
- Genre: Indie rock, blues rock, downtempo, pop rock, urban contemporary, soul
- Label: Warner Music Japan

Bonnie Pink chronology
Golden Tears (2005)	Every Single Day: Complete Bonnie Pink (1995–2006) (2006)	Thinking Out Loud (2007)

Every Single Day: Complete Bonnie Pink (1995–2006) is Bonnie Pink's third greatest hits album released under the Warner Music Japan label on July 26, 2006.

== Track listing ==
=== Disc One ===
1. Heaven's Kitchen (from Heaven's Kitchen)
2. Forget Me Not (from Evil & Flowers)
3. Awa ni Natta (泡になった, I Became a Bubble) (Non-album song)
4. Kanawanai Koto (かなわないこと, Not to Hope) (Non-album song)
5. Orenji (オレンジ, Orange) (from Blue Jam)
6. Inu to Tsuki (犬と月, A Dog and the Moon) (Non-album song)
7. Surprise! (Non-album song)
8. Lie Lie Lie (from Heaven's Kitchen)
9. Kingyo (金魚, Goldfish) (from Evil & Flowers)
10. It's Gonna Rain! (from Heaven's Kitchen)
11. Do You Crash? (from Heaven's Kitchen)
12. The Last Thing I Can Do (Non-album song)
13. Evil & Flowers (Piano Version) (from Evil & Flowers)

=== Disc Two ===
1. So Wonderful (from Golden Tears)
2. Daisy (Non-album song)
3. You Are Blue, So Am I (from Let Go)
4. Kako to Genjitsu (過去と現実, The Past and Reality) (from Let Go)
5. Sleeping Child (from Let Go)
6. Tonight, the Night (from Present)
7. Take Me In (from Just a Girl)
8. Nemurenai Yoru (眠れない夜, The Night When I Can't Sleep) (from Just a Girl)
9. Thinking of You (from Just a Girl)
10. New York (Non-album song)
11. Love is Bubble (Non-album song)
12. Private Laughter (from Even So)
13. Souldiers (Non-album song)
14. A Perfect Sky (from Thinking Out Loud)
15. Last Kiss (from Even So)

== Charts ==
Chart	Peak position	Sales total
Japan (Oricon)	2	486,000
