= Dear Diary (Bonnie Pink album) =

Studio album by Bonnie Pink
- Released: October 6, 2010
- Genres: R&B; soft rock
- Length: 60:44 (Disc1); 56:30 (Disc2); 79:55 (Disc3)
- Label: Warner Music Japan
- Producers: Burning Chicken (#1, 10); Bonnie Pink (#2); Tore Johansson ("4, 12, 14, 15); Shigekazu Aida (#3, 6); Curly Giraffe (#8); Track&Field (Brian West and Gerald Eaton) (#9); James Bryan (#5, 7, 11, 13)

Bonnie Pink chronology
One (2009)	Dear Diary (2010)	Chasing Hope (2012)

Singles from Dear Diary
- 1. "Morning Glory" Released: January 11, 2010; 2. "Is This Love?" Released: May 5, 2010; 3. "Kaito" Released: September 22, 2010

Dear Diary is Bonnie Pink's eleventh studio album released under the Warner Music Japan label on October 6, 2010. The deluxe edition came in a cardboard foldout sleeve and included a second CD of b-sides entitled "Bonnie Pink B-side collection (1996-2009)" and a DVD of a live performance titled "DVD Tour 2009 “ONE” Final at Akasaka BLITZ (July 31, 2009, Tokyo)".

AllMusic remarked about the album, "sometimes Dear Diary sounds like an Ayumi Hamasaki ripoff, and sometimes like Shonen Knife pretending to be Ayu, just to mess with the audience."

== Track listing ==
All tracks are written by Bonnie Pink.

Disc1: CD
No.	Title	Arranger(s)	Length
1.	"Is This Love?"	Burning Chicken	3:53
2.	"Morning Glory"	Masato Suzuki (Little Creatures), Tore Johansson	3:37
3.	"Cookie Flavor"	Shigekazu Aida	3:34
4.	"Suki Killer (スキKILLER; Love Killer)"	Tore Johansson	4:08
5.	"Hurricane"	James Bryan	3:40
6.	"Find A Way"	Shigekazu Aida	4:16
7.	"Home Sweet Home"	James Bryan	4:23
8.	"Many Moons Ago"	Curly Giraffe	4:26
9.	"World Peace"	Track & Field (Brian West and Gerald Eaton)	3:51
10.	"Birthday Girl"	Burning Chicken	3:58
11.	"Here I Am"	James Bryan	4:12
12.	"Kaito (カイト; Kite)"	Tore Johansson	4:09
13.	"Grow"	James Bryan	3:15
14.	"Nagare Boshi (流れ星; Shooting Star)"	Tore Johansson	4:50
15.	"Nami Nami (ナミナミ; Overflowingly)"	Tore Johansson	4:34
Total length:			60:37

Disc2: CD Bonnie Pink B-side collection (1996-2009)
No.	Title	Length
1.	"Awa ni Natta (泡になった; It became a bubble./It came to nothing.)" (contained in Surprise!)
2.	"Bubble Gum" (contained in Thinking of You)
3.	"Friends, Aren't We?" (contained in Do You Crash?)
4.	"One Night With Chocolate" (contained in Do You Crash?)
5.	"Passion Fruit" (contained in Take Me In)
6.	"Kanawanai Koto (かなわないこと; Not to Hope)" (contained in It's Gonna Rain!)
7.	"Let's Kiss And Make Up" (contained in Heaven's Kitchen)
8.	"What about me?" (contained in Take Me In)
9.	"The Last Things I Can Do" (contained in Forget Me Not)
10.	"That's what it's all about" (contained in Thinking of You)
11.	"You and I" (contained in Joy/Happy Ending)
12.	"New York" (contained in You Are Blue, So Am I)
13.	"Pump It Up!" (contained in Kane o Narashite)
14.	"Free" (contained in A Perfect Sky)
15.	"good-bye" (contained in Inu to Tsuki)
Total length:		56:30

Disc3: DVD Tour 2009 “ONE” Final at Akasaka BLITZ (July 31, 2009, Tokyo)
No.	Title	Length
1.	"Rock You Till the Dawn"
2.	"Fuchsia Fuchsia Fuchsia"
3.	"Mousou Lover (妄想Lover; Delusional Lover)"
4.	"Princess Incognito"
5.	"Won't Let You Go"
6.	"One Last Time"
7.	"Try Me Out"
8.	"Play & Pause"
9.	"Himitsu (秘密; Secret)"
10.	"Joy"
11.	"Get on the Bus"
12.	"Kane wo Narashite (鐘を鳴らして; Ring a Bell)"
13.	"Happy Ending"
14.	"Kanawanai Koto (かなわないこと; Not to Hope)"
15.	"Last kiss" (Acoustic ver.)
Total length:		79:55
