= Chasing Hope =

Studio album by Bonnie Pink
- Released: July 25, 2012
- Genre: R&B; soft rock
- Length: 51:42
- Label: Warner Music Japan
- Producer: Burning Chicken; Masato Suzuki; Shigekazu Aida; Curly Giraffe; Tore Johansson

Bonnie Pink chronology
Dear Diary (2010)	Chasing Hope (2012)	Infinity (2023)

Singles from Chasing Hope
- 1. "Tsumetai Ame" Released: February 29, 2012; 2. "Machi no Namae" Released: July 4, 2012

Chasing Hope is the twelfth studio album by the Japanese singer Bonnie Pink, released on July 25, 2012, by Warner Music Japan. The title was chosen due to the 2011 Tōhoku earthquake and tsunami, as Pink wanted to "deliver hope to Japanese people through music after the earthquake."

The album was released in two editions: a standard edition, and a limited edition with a DVD of performances from her 2010 "Dear Diary" tour at the Akasaka Blitz.

Prior to the album's release, all of the songs on the album were free to stream on the iTunes Store from July 18 to July 24; this was the first time a Japanese artist did this.

== Background ==
While touring for her remake album, Back Room, released the previous year, the Great East Japan Earthquake happened. Although at the time, she wanted to focus on her old songs, she felt she should give "power to others through [her] music", so she started writing songs meant to uplift others. On the title of the album, she stated:

I myself felt that it was time for an event that would give me a sense of hope. Since the mentality of the post-disaster period is reflected in this album, I wanted to deliver a piece that would make it easier for those affected by the disaster to take the next step forward. Naturally, I thought that the title "Chasing Hope" would be the most appropriate, and this is how it turned out.

== Promotion ==
The first single, "Tsumetai Ame", produced by Tore Johansson, was chosen as the theme song for the drama Dirty Mama!. The song was first released digitally the same day the drama aired, January 11, 2012, but was later released physically on February 29. Prior to its release, a music video and a special site containing lyrics and clips from the video were released. To commemorate the release of the single, a 14-hour broadcast featuring clips from across Pink's career was aired on Nico Nico Live Broadcast on March 4, and live performances were held at various locations on March 3 and 4.

The second single, "Machi no Namae", produced by Masato Suzuki of Little Creatures, was released on July 4.

== Track listing ==
All tracks are written by Bonnie Pink.

Chasing Hope track listing
No.	Title	Arranger/Producer	Length
1.	"Stand Up!"	Burning Chicken	4:17
2.	"Natsugare (ナツガレ, Summer Slump)"	Masato Suzuki	4:15
3.	"Mountain High"	Masato Suzuki	3:46
4.	"Bad Bad Boy"	Shigekazu Aida	3:43
5.	"Machi no Namae (街の名前, Town Name)"	Masato Suzuki	4:26
6.	"Animal Rendezvous"	Burning Chicken	3:43
7.	"My Angel"	Bonnie Pink	4:27
8.	"Tiger Lily"	Curly Giraffe	3:58
9.	"Baby Baby Baby"	Shigekazu Aida	5:58
10.	"Don't Cry For Me Anymore"	Masato Suzuki	4:54
11.	"Tsumetai Ame (冷たい雨, Chilly Rain)"	Tore Johansson	3:59
12.	"Change"	Masato Suzuki	4:16
Total length:			51:42

DVD: Tour 2010 "Dear Diary" At Akasaka Blitz (2010.11.28)
No.	Title	Director	Length
1.	"Morning Glory"	Go Matsumoto
2.	"Many Moons Ago"	Go Matsumoto
3.	"Here I Am"	Go Matsumoto
4.	"Home Sweet Home"	Go Matsumoto
5.	"Kite (カイト)"	Go Matsumoto
6.	"Is This Love?"	Go Matsumoto
7.	"Heaven's Kitchen"	Go Matsumoto

== Charts ==
Chart performance for Chasing Hope
Chart (2012)	Peak position
Japanese Albums (Oricon)	15
