= Bonnie's Kitchen =

Bonnie's Kitchen is Bonnie Pink's series of greatest hits albums. So far, two have been released:

- Bonnie's Kitchen 1
- Bonnie's Kitchen 2
