= Reminiscence (Bonnie Pink album) =

Studio album by Bonnie Pink
- Released: June 22, 2005
- Genre: Pop rock
- Label: Warner Music Japan

Bonnie Pink chronology
Even So (2004)	Reminiscence (2005)	Golden Tears (2005)

Reminiscence is Bonnie Pink's first cover album, released under the Warner Music Japan label on June 22, 2005. It included cover of songs from both Western artists, such as The Bangles, and Japanese artists, such as Tatsuro Yamashita.

== Track listing ==
CD
No.	Title	Lyrics	Music	sound produce	Length
1.	"Ordinary Angels" (original by Frente!)	Simon Austin, Angie Hart	Simon Austin, Angie Hart	Tore Johansson	2:57
2.	"Perfect" (original by Fairground Attraction)	Mark Edward, Cascian Nevin	Mark Edward, Cascian Nevin	mito (Clammbon), Yuichi Ohata	4:00
3.	"Manic Monday" (original by The Bangles)	Prince R.Nelson	Prince R.Nelson	Yuka Honda	4:00
4.	"Got Me a Feeling" (original by Misty Oldland)	Michele Oldland; Bonnie Pink (Japanese Lyrics)	Michele Oldland	DJ Mitsu the Beats	6:31
5.	"The Origin of Love" (original by Hedwig and the Angry Inch)	Stephen Trask	Stephen Trask	Honesty (Shigekazu Aida × Kiyoshi Takakuwa)	5:50
6.	"Don't Get Me Wrong" (original by The Pretenders)	Chrissie Hynde	Chrissie Hynde	The Miceteeth	3:35
7.	"Manatsu no Kajitsu (真夏の果実; "The Fruits of Summer")" (original by Southern All Stars)	Keisuke Kuwata	Keisuke Kuwata	Kazuyoshi Saito	4:46
8.	"That's Just What You Are" (original by Aimee Mann)	Aimee Mann, Jon Brion	Aimee Mann, Jon Brion	Bonnie Pink, Motoki Matsuoka, Shinya Okuno (Soul Flower Union)	4:06
9.	"Your Eyes" (original by Tatsuro Yamashita)	Alan O'Day	Tatsuro Yamashita	Tsuyoshi Kawakami & His Moodmakers	3:33
10.	"Through the Dark" (original by The Sundays)	David Gavurin, Harriet Wheeler	David Gavurin, Harriet Wheeler Harriet Wheeler	Bonnie Pink	4:17

== Charts ==
Chart	Peak position
Oricon Weekly Chart	#18
