= Bonnie's Kitchen 2 =

Compilation album by Bonnie Pink
- Released: January 19, 2000
- Recorded: 1996–1999
- Genres: Pop rock, blues rock, indie rock, soul
- Label: Pony Canyon

Bonnie Pink chronology
| Bonnie's Kitchen 1 (1999) | Bonnie's Kitchen 2 (2000) | Let Go (2000) |

Bonnie's Kitchen 2 is Bonnie Pink's second greatest hits album released under the Pony Canyon label on January 19, 2000.

== Track listing ==
1. Evil & Flowers (Piano Version) (from Evil & Flowers)
2. Forget Me Not (from Evil & Flowers)
3. Hickey Hickey (from Evil & Flowers)
4. Silence (from Heaven's Kitchen)
5. Friends, Aren't We? (Non-album song)
6. Only for Him (from Evil & Flowers)
7. Melody (from Heaven's Kitchen)
8. Quiet Life (from Evil & Flowers)
9. Meddler (from Evil & Flowers)
10. Mad Afternoon (from Heaven's Kitchen)
11. Get in My Hair (from Heaven's Kitchen)
12. The Last Thing I Can Do (Non-album song)
13. Blackbird (Previously Unreleased)
14. Bonus Track: We've Gotta Find a Way Back to Love (Non-album song)
