= Charlie Don't Surf =

Charlie Don't Surf is a line from the 1979 war film Apocalypse Now, notably referenced in popular culture.

Charlie Don't Surf may refer to:

== Television ==
- "Charlie Don't Surf" (Veronica Mars), an episode of season 3 of Veronica Mars
- "Charlie Don't Surf", an episode of season 5 of Numbers
- "Charlie Don't Surf", an episode of season 1 of The Commish
- "Charlie Don't Surf", an episode of Informer

== Music ==
- "Charlie Don't Surf", a song by The Clash from the 1980 album Sandinista!
- "Charlie Don't Surf", a song by Soul Flower Union from the 2002 album Love ± Zero
- "Charlie Don't Surf", a song by Funeral For a Friend from the 2008 album Memory and Humanity

== Other uses ==
- "Charlie Don't Surf", a level in the video game Call of Duty 4: Modern Warfare
- "Charlie Don't Surf", a sculpture made by Maurizio Cattelan

== See also ==
- China Beach Surf Club, a group of surfing US military members during the Vietnam War
