= Blue Jam (disambiguation) =

Blue Jam was an ambient radio comedy programme created and directed by Chris Morris.

Blue Jam may also refer to:

- Blue Jam (album), a 1995 album by Bonnie Pink
- "Blue Rhythm Jam", single jazz tune by Stan Getz 1965
- The Naked Ghost, Burp! and Blue Jam (1991), collection of short stories by Australian author Paul Jennings
