= Filmspotting =

Podcast about film

- Genre: Film talk

Cast and voices
- Hosted by: Adam Kempenaar and Josh Larsen

Technical specifications
- Audio format: MP3; Also airs Friday mornings and Saturday nights on 91.5 FM WBEZ (Chicago, IL)

Publication
- Original release: March 6, 2005
- Provider: PRX
- Updates: Weekly (Friday)

Related
- Website: www.filmspotting.net

Filmspotting is a weekly film podcast and radio program from Chicago hosted by Adam Kempenaar and Josh Larsen. The show originally began as a progression from Kempenaar's film blog Cinemascoped. He and his friend, Sam Van Hallgren (then Sam Hallgren), who had become a regular contributor to Cinemascoped began brainstorming when interest in the blog began to wane. What resulted was a film-talk podcast. While the whole concept of podcasting at the time was relatively new, Kempenaar had gotten the idea from an article appearing in Wired, and he and Van Hallgren decided to give it a try. The fledgling show began production in 2005, initially under the title Cinecast, but was changed to Filmspotting in 2006 due to a conflict over the name. Shortly after, the show was picked up by Chicago's NPR affiliate station, WBEZ.

== Hosts ==
=== Current ===
- Adam Kempenaar A 1997 graduate of Grinnell College with B.A. in English, he also holds a B.A. in communication/film studies and a M.A. in journalism from the University of Iowa (2005). Kempenaar was a film critic for The Daily Iowan for two years before moving to Chicago in the fall of 2002 to work in the media department of the Chicago Blackhawks, where he still serves as Senior Executive Director of Digital Content. He also hosted a weekly film talk show, "Burn Hollywood Burn," on 89.7 KRUI-FM in Iowa City. Kempenaar is a member of the Chicago Film Critics Association. He is married with four children: Holden, Sophie, Quinn and Conor.
- Josh Larsen joined Filmspotting as co-host in January 2012. Prior to that, he spent 11 years as a film critic for Chicago-based Sun-Times Media. Larsen also writes about movies at LarsenOnFilm and is editor of the faith and culture magazine Think Christian. He is also the author of a book about the movies, Movies Are Prayers (InterVarsity Press, 2017). He lives in the Chicago area with his wife and two daughters.

=== Former ===
- Sam Van Hallgren: Currently resides in the Driftless area of Wisconsin and previously worked on the public radio show This American Life. A graduate of Kenyon College (where he met Matty Robinson), Van Hallgren left the show as a host in September 2007 to focus on other pursuits and spend more time with his wife, leaving Matty "Ballgame" Robinson to co-host the show with Kempenaar. He has since returned to Filmspotting as one of the show's co-producers (the other being 'Golden' Joe DeCeault), and occasionally appears on the show as a guest host.
- Matty "Ballgame" Robinson: Originally Van Hallgren's roommate, Robinson was initially an occasional contributor, mainly appearing as a special guest or filling in when either Adam or Sam could not record. His first appearance was on episode #64 (Top 5 Villains). In September 2007 when Van Hallgren's departure was announced, the hosts revealed that Robinson would take over the co-hosting duties full-time. Robinson attended Kenyon College in Gambier, Ohio (where he met Sam Van Hallgren) and holds a B.A. in creative writing, as well as an MFA in acting. On September 24, 2011, during the airing of Filmspotting episode #365, it was revealed that Robinson would be leaving the show.

=== Teaching at the University of Chicago ===
In the spring of 2008, Kempenaar and Robinson were given teaching positions at the Graham School of General Studies (part of the University of Chicago) for a one-semester film course, focusing on the films of Michael Curtiz and Howard Hawks. The course, proving a success, was cause for the pair to be subsequently invited back by the university to teach further courses in each of the following three school years. The below table offers a brief summary of these classes:

Name of Course	Year	Notes
Hawks vs. Curtiz: The Auteur and the Hack	2008	Films included: Mildred Pierce, The Big Sleep, Casablanca, Yankee Doodle Dandy, Gentlemen Prefer Blondes, The Comancheros and Rio Bravo.
The New Hollywood	2009	A study of the genre that came about in the 1960s and early 1970s. Films included: Jules and Jim, Bonnie and Clyde, The Graduate, In the Heat of the Night, Easy Rider, Midnight Cowboy, The Long Goodbye, Mean Streets, and Badlands.
Nobody's Perfect: The Films of Billy Wilder	2010	Films included: Double Indemnity, Ninotchka, Stalag 17, The Apartment, Some Like It Hot and Sunset Boulevard.
Movies About Movies – The Star, The Writer, and The Director	2011	From the catalog description: the course will 'analyze what movies about movies reveal about the creative process'. Films include A Star is Born, Singin' in the Rain, Day For Night, Barton Fink, 8 1/2 and Mulholland Drive.

== Show format ==
The show starts with a review of a recently released film, followed by listener feedback. After the feedback segment is "Massacre Theater," a weekly contest that has the hosts performing short scenes of dialogue from various films, with a prize going to one listener who correctly guessed which film it was from. On rare occasions, the hosts will perform the scene with guests, with one notable episode including Kempenaar performing a scene from The Professional with Edgar Wright and Simon Pegg, who were being interviewed to promote their film Hot Fuzz.

Each episode ends with the "Top Five" segment, which sees each host picking their top five movies that pertain to a certain topic for the week. The segment was initially inspired by similar scenes in High Fidelity and the Nick Hornby novel it was based on. These picks exclude certain "pantheon" choices, which are films such as The Godfather or Citizen Kane that have been forever excluded from future lists for being too "obvious." They also have their own personal "penalty box" films, which temporarily excludes films that one host has picked too often.

Older episodes included a segment where the hosts each highlighted an overlooked film on DVD to recommend to the listener. However, that segment was later removed from the main show and placed in their short-lived video podcast, Cinecast A/V. The segment was then moved to their weekly e-mail newsletter "The Dope Sheet" before that was also discontinued.

On occasion, particularly when Adam and/or Josh are away from the Filmspotting studio, or when there is a special edition of the show, guest hosts are sometimes featured. Included among them are Chicago Tribune film critic, Michael Phillips, Matt Singer of IndieWire and Alison Wilmore (formerly of the Independent Film Channel) -- the latter two hosting a spinoff podcast called Filmspotting: Streaming Video Unit (SVU)

== Marathons ==
For the "Movie Marathons", the hosts review six to eight movies from a particular genre or director that they haven't already seen. At the end of their six- to eight-week marathon, they present awards for best film, best director, best actor, etc., for that marathon, naming the award after something related to the genre or director they've just covered.

These marathons, and their associated awards, have been, in order:

- Classic Westerns ("The Dukes"),
- Horror Films ("The Haddonfields"),
- Alfred Hitchcock films ("The MacGuffins"),
- Overlooked auteurs ("The Andy's"),
- Musicals ("The Gingers"),
- Werner Herzog/Klaus Kinski films ("Our Best Fiends"),
- Screwball Comedy ("The Astas"),
- Documentaries ("The Nanooks"),
- Animated Films ("The Harryhausens"),
- Silent Films ("The Chaneys")
- Film Noir ("The Marlowes"),
- Ingmar Bergman films ("The Svens"),
- Pedro Almodóvar films ("The Matadors"),
- 1970s SciFi films ("The Damn Dirty Apes"),
- Classic Heist films ("The Stephies (Le Stephanois)"),
- Angry Young Men films ("The Kitchen Sinks"),
- New Hollywood films ("The Plastics"),
- Akira Kurosawa films ("The Ronins"),
- Palme d'Or winning films ("The Bronze Fronds"),
- Ernst Lubitsch films ("The (Lubitsch) Touches"),
- Billy Wilder films ("The Sheldrakes")
- Powell-Pressburger films ("The Archers")
- Krzysztof Kieślowski films ("Dekalog")
- Robert Bresson films ("The Martyrs")
- Contemporary Iranian Cinema ("The 'These Are Not Awards' Awards")
- Blaxploitation ("The Mayfields")
- Marx Brothers ("The Gookies")
- Max Ophuls ("The Dollies")
- Korean Auteurs ("The Gwishins")
- Satyajit Ray ("The Mitras")
- Elaine May ("The Blind Camels")
- Contemporary Nordic Cinema ("The Sad Tubas")
- Luis Buñuel ("The Obscure Objects")
- Agnès Varda ("The Cleos")
- New Argentine Cinema ("The Ficciones")
- Vincente Minnelli ("The Garlands")
- John Cassavetes ("The Blue Hats")
- Stanley Donen ("The Fizzies")
- Dietrich/Von Sternberg ("The Boas")
- Contemporary Chinese Cinema ("The Umbrellas")
- Bette Davis ("The Peepers")
- Overlooked Auteurs ("The Burnt Potatoes")
- 1940's Film Noir ("The Savages")
- The World of Wong Kar Wai ("The Tonys")
- Buster Keaton ("The Porkpies")
- Barbara Stanwyck ("The Hopsie Potsies")
- Sight and Sound Top 100 Blindspots ("The BFIs (Best in Foreign Immersion)")
- African Cinema ("The African Cinema Awards")
- William Wyler ("The Miniver Roses")
- Sidney Lumet ("The Verdicts")
- Andrei Tarkovsky ("The Holy Fools")

The Palme d'Or marathon culminated in a screening of Afterschool at the Gene Siskel Film Center in Chicago on December 12, 2009, followed by a Q&A with writer/director Antonio Campos and featured actor Michael Stuhlbarg. "Afterschool" was an Un Certain Regard selection at the 2008 Cannes Film Festival.

== Music ==
During breaks in the show, "Filmspotting" primarily features music from artists on the Chicago label Bloodshot Records, in addition to artists from Messenger Records, and, even more rarely, Merge Records. The guitar-driven theme song is "This Machine" by now-defunct Chicago band Age of the Rifle.

== Name change ==
The last Cinecast show was the two-part 100th podcast on May 12–13, 2006, after which the name changed to Filmspotting. The specific reason for the change was not discussed, but there is a company called CineCast that produces pre-show advertisements in theatres. Adam and Sam originally said the show would be renamed The Cinema Show, but then solicited suggestions from listeners. Contenders included Cinecrack, Cinediction and Burn, Hollywood, Burn, but the hosts announced their final selection on the 8 May 2006 show (Cinecast #98): Filmspotting. Listener Nicholas Correnti from Florida State University Film School suggested the name Filmspotting and won $50 worth of DVDs for his part in renaming Cinecast.

== See also ==
- List of film and television podcasts
