= Thinking Out Loud (disambiguation) =

"Thinking Out Loud" is a 2014 single by Ed Sheeran.

Thinking out Loud may also refer to:

== Books and lectures ==
- Thinking Out Loud, a 1994 book by Anna Quindlen
- Thinking Out Loud, a 1998 book by Stephen Joel Trachtenberg
- “Thinking Out Loud” Lectures, by Bonnie Honig, 2013

== Film and broadcasting ==
- Buckminster Fuller: Thinking Out Loud, a 1996 TV documentary
- "Thinking Out Loud" (Inside No. 9), a 2020 episode of the BBC anthology TV series
- Thinking Out Loud, a 1991 documentary featuring ceramic artist Betty Woodman

=== Radio shows ===
- WJCW, Thinking Out Loud local morning show with hosts Tim Cable and Carl Swann
- WUML, Thinking Out Loud, a daytime show focusing on current local and world issues
- KBIA, Thinking Out Loud with Darren Hellwege

== Racing ==
- Thinking Out Loud, horse, 2012 winner of the North America Cup

== Music ==
=== Albums ===
- Thinking Out Loud (Bonnie Pink album), 2007
- Thinking Out Loud (Frank Gambale album), 1995
- Thinkin Out Loud (Kristinia DeBarge album), 2016
- Thinking Out Loud (Young Dolph album), 2017
- Thinking Out Loud, a 2007 album by Pamelia Kurstin

=== Songs ===
- "Thinking Out Loud", a 1934 song from the musical Calling All Stars
- "Thinkin' Out Loud", a 1971 song by The Band from the album Cahoots
- "Thinking Out Loud", a 1997 song by Ron Sexsmith from the album Other Songs
- "Thinkin' Out Loud", a 2001 song by Fu Manchu from the album California Crossing
- "Thinking Out Loud", a 2005 song by Emiliana Torrini from the album Fisherman's Woman
- "Thinkin Out Loud", a 2015 song by JoJo from the album LoveJo2

== See also ==
- Benefits of Thinking Out Loud, a 2001 album by A Wilhelm Scream
- Thinking Allowed (disambiguation)
