= Golden Tears (album) =

Studio album by Bonnie Pink
- Released: September 21, 2005
- Recorded: 2005
- Genre: R&B; soul; pop rock
- Length: 48:45
- Label: Warner Music Japan
- Producer: Tore Johansson (#2, 8, 10, 12); Burning Chicken (#1, 4, 6, 9, 11, 13); Hod David (#3, 5, 7)

Bonnie Pink chronology
Reminiscence (2005)	Golden Tears (2005)	Every Single Day: Complete Bonnie Pink (1995–2006) (2006)

Singles from Golden Tears
- 1. "So Wonderful" Released: August 3, 2005

Golden Tears was Bonnie Pink's eighth studio album released under the Warner Music Japan label on September 21, 2005.

== Track listing ==
All tracks are written by Bonnie Pink, mixed by Tore Johansson.

CD
No.	Title	Producer(s)	Length
1.	"So Wonderful"	Burning Chicken
2.	"Paradiddle-free"	Tore Johansson
3.	"Coast to Coast"	Hod David
4.	"Addiction"	Burning Chicken
5.	"Mirror"	Hod David
6.	"Nichinichisō (日々草; Daily Grass/Catharanthus roseus)"	Burning Chicken
7.	"Robotomy"	Hod David
8.	"Monster"	Tore Johansson
9.	"Rise and Shine"	Burning Chicken
10.	"Cotton Candy"	Tore Johansson
11.	"Nocturne"	Burning Chicken
12.	"You Got Me Good"	Tore Johansson
13.	"Believe"	Burning Chicken
Total length:			48:45

== Charts ==
=== Album ===
Chart	Peak position
Oricon Weekly Chart	#12

=== Single ===
Date	Title	Peak position
August 3, 2005	"So Wonderful"	#46
