= Thinking Allowed (disambiguation) =

Thinking Allowed is a BBC Radio 4 series discussing social science.

Thinking Allowed may also refer to:

- "Thinking Allowed?", the first single by British folk metal band Skyclad
- Thinking Allowed: The Best of Prospect, 1995–2005, a collection of essays previously published in Prospect magazine

== See also ==
- Thinking Out Loud (disambiguation)
