= Isle of Wight Festival 2005 =

Music festival on Isle of Wight

- Genre: rock, pop
- Dates: 10–12 June 2005
- Locations: Seaclose Park, Newport, Isle of Wight, UK
- Website: Official website

The Isle of Wight Festival 2005 is the fourth revived Isle of Wight Festival on the Seaclose Park site in Newport on the Isle of Wight. The attendance of this festival was around 50,000, a 15,000 increase on sales of the year before, which was testament to its growing success as a British music festival. It was the second year of Nokia sponsorship, which saw the likes of The Who, David Bowie and R.E.M. grace the Island stage.

In this year the Isle of Wight festival began to seriously stake its claim as one of the big festivals of Britain. Attracting a line-up featuring Faithless, Travis and R.E.M. This event was filmed and highlights of the event were shown at late night by Channel 4. This was scheduled to include Morrissey as the Saturday night headliner, but he had to pull out and was replaced by Travis.

== New Features ==
- The site was expanded into the "Medina Field" (the Arboretum), and thus the main non-camping entrance was now inside Medina High School car park instead of directly next to the main arena itself as it had been before.
- A path was constructed through fields to link the main arena with the campsite without walking along the A3054.

== Highlights ==
- Razorlight bassist Carl Dalemo comically failed to leave the stage after the rest of the band had played and continued to play music.
- The unprecedented standing ovation received by Goldie Lookin' Chain after their excellent Saturday afternoon slot(NOTE: no chairs in this event, therefore the so-called "standing ovation" went on for the whole show).
- Travis singer Francis Healy 'forgetting' his lyrics and being prompted by the audience, who were familiar with catchy choruses.
- The embarrassing emptiness of the main stage during the set of Kate Aumonier, despite her commendable attempts to win over a small audience.
- Michael Stipe's theatrical stage antics which whipped the crowd into a frenzy throughout much of the R.E.M. set.

== Line Up ==
=== Friday ===
- Faithless
- Razorlight
- Supergrass
- Idlewild
- The Black Velvets
- The Mighty Roars

=== Saturday ===
- Travis
- Roxy Music
- Feeder
- Goldie Lookin' Chain
- Babyshambles
- Ray Davies
- Nine Black Alps
- Tara Blaise
- Jackson Analogue
- Los Fantasmas

=== Sunday ===
- R.E.M.
- Snow Patrol
- Embrace
- Starsailor
- The Magic Numbers
- The Subways
- Caravan
- Countermine
- Kate Aumonier
