= Winds Fairground =

Studio album by Soul Flower Union
- Released: February 20, 1999
- Genre: Experimental rock, folk rock, folk, psychedelic rock
- Label: Ki/oon Sony

Winds Fairground is an album by the Japanese band Soul Flower Union. The album was recorded in Ireland, and has the heaviest Celtic music influence of all their albums. However, the influence of traditional Japanese music, Okinawan music and swing jazz also remains heavy.

== Track listing ==
#	English Title	Japanese Title	Time
1.	"Kaze no Ichi"	「風の市」	3:41
2.	"Wasurerareta Otoko"	「忘れられた男」	5:29
3.	"London Derry"	「ロンドン・デリー」	4:42
4.	"Horizon March"	「ホライズン・マーチ」	3:07
5.	"Idea no Umbrella"	「イデアのアンブレラ」	3:44
6.	"Each Little Thing"	「イーチ・リトル・シング」	4:47
7.	"Senka no Kanata"	「戦火のかなた」	5:08
8.	"Yaponesia no Akai Sora"	「ヤポネシアの赤い空」	3:59
9.	"Koi no Pearl Harbor"	「恋のパールハーバー」	3:43
10.	"Marginal Surf"	「マージナル・サーフ」	2:53
11.	"Blue Monday Parade"	「ブルー・マンデー・パレード」	3:42
12.	"Taiyō ni Yakakerute"	「太陽に灼かれて」	4:57
13.	"Ao Tenshō no Crown"	「青天井のクラウン」	4:14
