= Kate Aumonier =

British singer

Kate Aumonier is a London based singer-songwriter born in Sussex, England. Her debut album was released in 2004 entitled 'Here I am'.

== Biography ==
As a former drama school student, she was talent spotted by veteran UK producer Glyn Johns, a friend of Aumonier's father at the age of 17. Johns was most impressed by her vocal talents and recommended that she travel to Los Angeles and team up with his son Ethan, also a well known producer. Johns found Aumonier session work on Emmylou Harris and Linda Ronstadt’s Grammy-nominated duo album, Western Wall: The Tucson Sessions. In 2000, Aumonier returned to the UK where she began a residency at "The Kashmire Klub", one of London's up-and-coming venues. She opened for A-ha at the Royal Albert Hall and toured the country. Aumonier then teamed up with fellow songwriter Tim Lind and began on writing material for a planned solo project. This later moved closer to fruition when she signed a recording contract with the "When!" offshoot of Sanctuary Records. The four-track Fall From Grace EP was released at the end of 2003 and overall attracted good reviews with attention being paid to her raw vocal talent and her ability to craft sumptuous, melodic pop rock songs. All of the tracks from the EP were included on her debut album "Here I Am", which was released in July 2004. In 2005 she got a slot on Sunday at the Isle of Wight Festival.

Aumonier is currently singing with Ben Parker in a group called Chains.

BABE

== Discography ==
- 2003 - Fall From Grace EP
- 2004 - Here I Am
