= The Mighty Roars =

British alternative rock band

- Origin: England
- Genres: Alternative rock, Post-punk, Pop
- Years active: 2005–present
- Label: One Little Indian Records
- Members: Lara Granqvist; Martin Pilkington; David Pringuer
- Website: http://www.themightyroars.com/

The Mighty Roars are an English three piece alternative rock band from London signed to One Little Indian Records. The group won Xfm's Unsigned band competition in 2005 and released their debut album, Swine & Cockerel in 2007.

== Background ==
Formed by David Pringuer (drums, vocals) and Lara Granqvist (bass, guitar, vocals) in 2004 after they met Martin Pilkington (guitar, vocals) through an advert in NME and began gigging in London.

In 2005 they were invited to open that year's Isle of Wight Festival which gained the band much publicity. The same year the band won Xfm's unsigned competition and were given day time radio play-listings. After attracting attention of Artrocker magazine which championed their self-recorded debut EP online they were approached by Little Teddy Recordings of Munich, Germany who released this EP "Take a Bite of Peach".

Whilst touring in Austria the band were forced to sack their drummer who had been caught allegedly stealing from a promoter. David Pringuer, who had been playing bass, took the role and learned the drums and Lara Granqvist switched from rhythm guitar to the bass. The band had always recorded as a four piece but re-adapted their sound to fit the new line-up. The first gig as this line-up was at the club Madame Jojo's supporting Guillemots, the second was at the "Purple Turtle" in Camden, London where the band were approached by a scout for One Little Indian Records with whom the band subsequently signed a recording contract in 2006.

After a failed attempt to record the album in Malmo with Tore Johansson, the band used their remaining recording budget to self record their debut album Swine & Cockerel in Monnow Valley Studio, Wales, in the spring of 2006. The album was released on 16 April 2007. All four singles from the first album ("Whale!", "Sellotape", "Daddy Oh" and "Funky Machine") received regular radio play on BBC, XFM, Virgin Radio and Kerrang Radio. The videos for all of the singles were play-listed on MTV. Q, amongst others, reviewed the album favourably with 4 stars. Unfortunately, the band did not consolidate this success in the media with a UK tour due to their booking agent mysteriously disappearing during the booking of the tour. The tour was subsequently cancelled but the band toured extensively in mainland Europe playing the club and festival circuit throughout 2007.

== Discography ==
- "Take a Bite of Peach" EP 2006 (Little Teddy Recordings, Germany)
- "Whale!" CD single, 7" Vinyl Ltd edition single, 2006 (One Little Indian Records)
- "Sellotape" CD single, 7" Vinyl Ltd edition single, 2006 (One Little Indian Records)
- Swine & Cockerel CD Album, LP, 2007 (One Little Indian Records)
- "Daddy Oh" CD EP, 7" Vinyl Ltd edition EP, 2007 (One Little Indian Records)
