= Yoko Utsumi =

Japanese musician

Yoko Utsumi is a Japanese musical artist. Her solo music is a blend of punk, rock and ska influences, with some blues and jazz thrown in. During her long career, she has also played Japanese traditional music.

Utsumi has been a member of a few important Japanese underground bands, including Mescaline Drive, Soul Flower Union and Soul Flower Mononoke Summit. Although she left Soul Flower Union in 1998, she still occasionally appears on the band's albums and live shows. She is also still a member of Soul Flower Mononoke Summit, an acoustic offspring of Soul Flower Union which plays traditional Asian music with protest lyrics.

She has one self-titled album released in the United States on the Asian Man Records label, in 2005. She also performs with a band called YOKOLOCO, which includes Soul Flower Union keyboardist Shinya Okuno and former Thee Michelle Gun Elephant drummer Kazuyuki Kuhara.
