= Kyohei Tsutsumi Tribute: The Popular Music =

Kyohei Tsutsumi Tribute: the popular music

Compilation album by Various artists
- Released: July 11, 2007
- Genre: Pop
- Length: 49:52
- Language: Japanese
- Label: Nayutawave/Universal

Kyohei Tsutsumi Tribute (筒美京平トリビュート), subtitled the popular music, is a tribute album to a Japanese composer Kyōhei Tsutsumi, released in 2007 by Natutawave Records under the distribution of Universal Music Group.

== Album information ==
The album was produced to celebrate the 40th Anniversary of Tsutsumi's professional career as a songwriter. Tadataka Watanabe, his younger brother who has worked as a record executive of Warner Music Japan, was credited as a producer of the whole album.

From among over five-hundreds of his compositions that entered the Japanese chart, following songs were chosen for the album. These original versions were also compiled on CD entitled The Popular Music: Original Compilation, and simultaneously released with tribute album.

Title	Lyricist	Original Performer	Notes
"Saraba Koibito"	Osamu Kitayama	Masaaki Sakai	Release date – May 1, 1971; Chart position: #2
"Blue Light Yokohama"	Jun Hashimoto	Ayumi Ishida	Release date – December 25, 1968; Chart position: #1
"Tasogare My Love"	Yū Aku	Junko Ōhashi	Release date – August 5, 1978; Chart position: #2
"Sexual Violet No.1"	Takashi Matsumoto	Masahiro Kuwana	Release date – June 21, 1979; Chart position: #1
"Ningyo"	Nokko	Nokko	Release date – March 9, 1994; Chart position: #2
"Osewa ni Narimashita"	Michio Yamagami	Jun Inoue	Release date – September 21, 1971; Chart position: #17
"Tonde Istanbul"	Tetsuya Chiaki	Mayo Shono	Release date – April 1, 1978; Chart position: #3
"Miserarete"	Yoko Aki	Judy Ongg	Release date – February 25, 1979; Chart position: #1
"Natsu no Klaxon"	Masao Urino	Junichi Inagaki	Release date – July 21, 1983; Chart position: #23
"Manatsu no Dekigoto"	Jun Hashimoto	Miki Hirayama	Release date – May 25, 1971; Chart position: #5
"Momen no Handkerchief"	Takashi Matsumoto	Hiromi Ōta	Release date – December 21, 1975; Chart position: #2
"Mata Au Hi Made"	Yū Aku	Kiyohiko Ozaki	Release date – March 5, 1971; Chart position: #1

About this project, Tsutsumi said as follow: "Songs I wrote 30 or 40 years ago were revisited by younger artists. They have completed 12 tracks for this album, in their own very distinctive and attractive renditions. As a songwriter, I couldn't be happier. I would like to show my greatest gratitude to all the artists and personnel who took part in producing the album."

== Track listing ==
All songs composed by Kyōhei Tsutsumi

1. "Saraba Koibito (さらば恋人)" – 3:04
  - Performer – Masayoshi Yamazaki
  - Arranger – Takayuki Hattori
2. "Blue Light Yokohama (ブルー・ライト・ヨコハマ)" – 3:30
  - Performer – Kou Shibasaki
  - Arranger – Keiji Tanabe (with strings arrangement by Yasuaki Maejima)
3. "Tasogare My Love (たそがれマイ･ラブ)" – 3:59
  - Performer – Hideaki Tokunaga
  - Arranger – Tokunaga, Masayuki Sakamoto
4. "Sexual Violet No.1" – 4:44
  - Performer – Tsunku
  - Arranger – Shunsuke Suzuki
5. "Ningyo (人魚)" – 4:39
  - Performer – Bonnie Pink
  - Arranger – Shuntaro Kobayashi
6. "Osewa ni Narimashita (お世話になりました)" (renewed lyrics by ET-King) – 2:58
  - Performer – ET-King
7. "Tonde Istanbul Homme (飛んでイスタンブール Homme)" – 5:54
  - Performer – Masafumi Akikawa
  - Arranger – Takeshi Senoo
8. "Miserarete (魅せられて)" – 3:49
  - Performer – Hitomi Shimatani
  - Arranger – Yuta Nakano
9. "Natsu no Klaxon (夏のクラクション)" – 4:12
  - Performer – Gospellers
  - Arranger – Akira Inoue
10. "Manatsu no Dekigoto (真夏の出来事)" – 5:09
  - Performer – melody.
  - Arranger – melody., Yuichi Hamamatsu
11. "Momen no Handkerchief (木綿のハンカチーフ)" – 5:06
  - Performer – Masamune Kusano (from Spitz)
  - Arranger – Shintarō Tokita (from Sukima Switch)
12. "Mata Au Hi Made (また逢う日まで)" – 2:48
  - Performer – Crazy Ken Band
  - Arranger – Masao Onose, Trio the Dog Horns

== Chart positions ==
Chart (2007)	Position
Japanese Oricon Albums Chart	12
