= Screwball Comedy =

Studio album by Soul Flower Union
- Released: July 25, 2001
- Genre: Experimental rock, hard rock, psychedelic rock
- Label: Respect Record

Screwball Comedy is an album by the Japanese band Soul Flower Union. The album found the band going into a simpler, harder-rocking direction, after several heavily world-music influenced albums.

== Track listing ==
#	English Title	Japanese Title	Time
1.	"Survivors Banquet"	「サヴァイヴァーズ・バンケット」	4:43
2.	"Satsujinkyō Roulette"	「殺人狂ルーレット」	3:38
3.	"Arechinite"	「荒れ地にて」	4:45
4.	"Dynamite no Ad-Balloon"	「ダイナマイトのアドバルーン」	3:45
5.	"Natsu Dōrai"	「夏到来」	5:45
6.	"Nodura wa Hoshi Akari"	「野づらは星あかり」	3:25
7.	"Seiki no Serenade"	「世紀のセレナーデ」	4:20
8.	"Omagatoki"	「オーマガトキ」	5:05
9.	"Go-Go Futen Girl"	「GO-GOフーテン・ガール」	4:04
10.	"No to Ieru Otoko"	「NOと言える男」	2:38
11.	"Caravan ni Koiuta"	「キャラバンに恋唄」	5:02
