= Morning Glory (Bonnie Pink song) =

Single by Bonnie Pink
- Released: January 11, 2010
- Recorded: 2010
- Genre: Urban contemporary, soul
- Length: 3:37
- Label: Warner Music Japan
- Songwriter: Bonnie Pink

Bonnie Pink singles chronology
"Joy/Happy Ending" (2009)	"Morning Glory" (2010)	"Is This Love?" (2010)

"Morning Glory" is Bonnie Pink's second digital single. The single was released under the Warner Music Japan label on January 11, 2010.

== Track listing ==
Digital Download
No.	Title	Length
1.	"Morning Glory"	3:37
Total length:		3:37

== Charts ==
Chart	Peak position
Billboard Japan Hot 100	17
Billboard Adult Contemporary Airplay	4
