= We've Gotta Find a Way Back to Love =

Single by Bonnie Pink
- Released: June 28, 1996
- Recorded: 1996
- Genre: Pop rock, soul
- Label: Pure Sand
- Songwriter: Holland–Dozier–Holland

Bonnie Pink singles chronology
"Surprise!" (1996)	"We've Gotta Find a Way Back to Love" (1996)	"Do You Crash?" (1996)

"We've Gotta Find a Way Back to Love" is a song by Freda Payne from her 1973 album Reaching Out, written by the songwriting team of Holland–Dozier–Holland. It was later covered by Bonnie Pink and released as her third single on the Pure Sand label on June 28, 1996.

== Track listing ==
- a1. "We've Gotta Find a Way Back to Love" by Bonnie Pink
- b1. "Living in the Dark" by Cokeberry
