= Love ± Zero =

Studio album by Soul Flower Union
- Released: 2002
- Genre: J-Rock
- Label: Independent label

Love ± Zero (pronounced "Love Plus/Minus Zero") is an album by the Japanese band Soul Flower Union.

== Track listing ==
#	English Title	Japanese Title	Time
1.	"Tanzania kara Patagonia made"	「タンザニアからパタゴニアまで」	4:11
2.	"Free Balloon"	「フリー・バルーン」	4:54
3.	"Crazy Love"	「クレイジー・ラヴ」	3:41
4.	"Big Apple"	「ビッグ・アップル」	4:34
5.	"She"	「SHE」	4:49
6.	"Charlie Don't Surf"	「チャーリー・ドント・サーフ」	4:52
7.	"Raglan Road"	「ラグラン・ロード」	3:32
8.	"I Love You"	「I LOVE YOU」	2:01
9.	"Arashi kara no Kakurega"	「嵐からの隠れ家」	3:36
10.	"Levelers no Nyūjō"	「レヴェラーズの入場」	1:21
