= Chindon'ya =

Type of traditional musical street performer in Japan

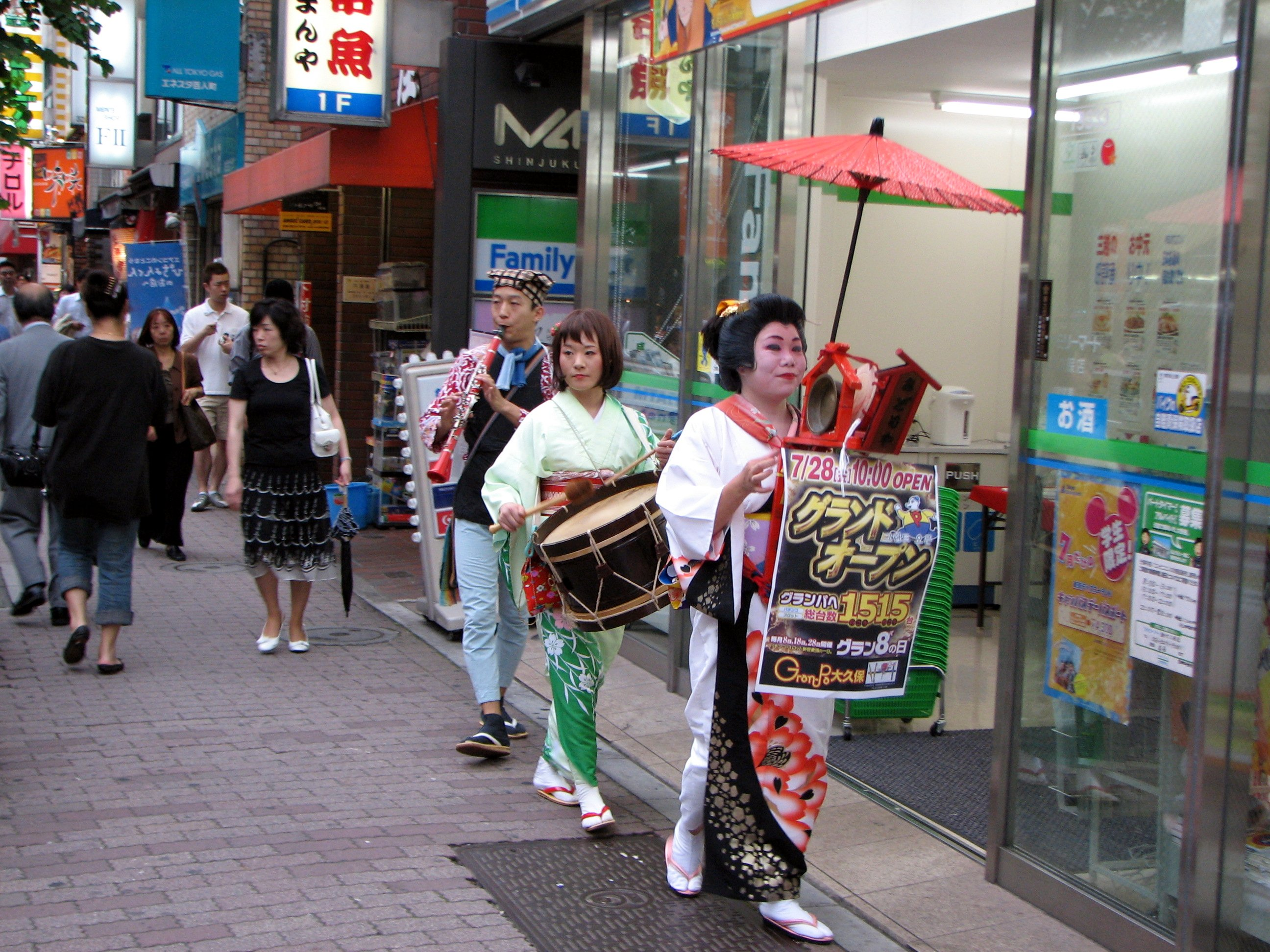
Chindon'ya street performers in Okubo, Tokyo, advertising for the opening of a pachinko parlor.

Chindon'ya (チンドン屋), also known as Japanese marching bands, and known historically as tōzai'ya (東西屋) or hiromeya (広目屋/披露目屋) are a type of elaborately costumed street musicians in Japan who advertise for shops and other establishments. Chindon'ya advertise the opening of new stores or other venues and promote special events such as price discounts. In modern-day Japan, chindon'ya are a rare sight, having been usurped by advertising in media such as magazines, television, and the Internet.

== Etymology ==
The word "chindon'ya" consists of the onomatopoeic words 'chin' and 'don' to describe the sound created by the performers' instruments, with the '-ya' suffix roughly equating to the English inflectional suffix "-er" in this context.

== History ==
=== Origin as single performers in Osaka ===
Musical street performers have a long history in Japan, with a range of practices, from the founder of kabuki, Izumo no Okuni, to the komusō mendicant monks of the Fuke school of Zen Buddhism. The first recorded instance of street performers forming a chindon'ya for the purposes of advertising appears in Osaka during the 19th century (late Edo period and early Meiji period), with the first known chindon'ya generally thought to be a candy seller in Osaka named Amekatsu, who, around 1845, used singing and a noise making toy to attract attention to his own portable candy stall.

Amekatsu, who was known for his strong voice, became well known in the city, and thus began to advertise for other stores as well as his own, doing so wearing a large hat, straw sandals and a belt with small bells attached to it, using a wooden hyogoshi noisemaker to draw people's attention. Amekatsu was succeeded by a former bath attendant, Isamikame, who also used to shout "tozai" (lit., "East-West", equivalent to "come one, come all"). Subsequently, such advertising street performers were called tozaiya in Osaka up to World War II. He soon received competition from another advertiser called Maemoto, and they split their business, with one covering the Uemachi region and the other covering the Shinmachi region of Osaka. After Maemoto died in 1891, his brother, also called Maemoto took over the business, and he was soon joined by his son and daughter, probably the first female chindon'ya. Maemoto is also famous as being the first person in Osaka to die from electric shock in 1893. Other well-known performers from this time are Tanbataya Kurimaru, a former sweet chestnut seller, and Satsumaya Imosuke, a former bean seller. These two also occasionally added a second performer to their band.

=== Group performers in Tokyo ===
At the beginning of the Meiji period, chindon'ya was still unknown in Tokyo, with advertising still mainly done via curtains (noren), billboards (kanban), and flyers (hikifuda). Stalls also advertised for themselves by making noise and wearing colorful clothes, a widely known example of the time being the extremely colorfully dressed pharmacist named Iwashiya. During this time, newspapers and posters also started to appear in Japan, and were subsequently used for advertising. The military also started to popularize western style marching bands, and at the same time public bands started to appear. In 1885, an advertising agency in Tokyo, Hiromeya (wide eyes), hired musicians for advertising. Hiromeya was founded by a former tōzaiya from Osaka named Akita Ryukichi. He soon found out that a one-person band was not as popular in Tokyo as in Osaka, and hired larger bands of more than 10 performers for advertising purposes, following the popularity of military and public bands. His band also provided entertainment at festivals and parties, and also created background music for silent films. He was also hired by the Kirin beer company, whose advertising campaign spread out to Osaka. In Osaka, this form of group bands was yet unknown, as only individual performers were hired for advertising. The police also had to stop some of the larger performances in Osaka, as they hindered traffic, partially due to the 2 metres (6 ft 7 in)-tall beer bottle the group was equipped with. The Hiromeya business grew, and they were even asked to perform at the burial of Emperor Meiji in 1912. The business still exists nowadays, although they now do mainly decorations.

=== Evolution of the modern chindon'ya ===
Tanbataya Kurimaru and Satsumaya Imosuke in Osaka were inspired by the bands of Hiromeya during the Kirin advertising campaign. They enlarged their groups and equipped them with drums and even fancier clothes, often matching the products of the advertised shop. However, they neglected rhythm and quality of the music over volume, and occasionally got arrested by the police. Some bigger engagements lasted for up to six months and reached Kyūshū and Shikoku.

The technological advances opened up many other ways of advertising that competed with the chindon'ya, who had already been competing with newspapers since 1910. By 1920, advertising by hot-air balloon and airplane had begun in Japan, with both carrying large advertising banners through the air; at around the same time, neon signs began to appear in Tokyo. With the appearance of sound film in Japan in 1929, about 3,000 street advertisers in Japan lost their jobs. A strike in 1930 had no effect on this and did not improve the situation. In response to the economic environment, the groups reduced their size to 4 or 5 people, and became known as chindon'ya. For many this was the last straw before unemployment and poverty, and hence the chindon'ya were considered to be of very low social status. The Great Depression in 1930 reduced the 'chindon'ya in Japan even more, and during World War II street performances were forbidden altogether.

=== The golden age ===
The chindon'ya had a revival again between 1946 and 1956, and between 1950 and 1960 there were up to 2,500 chindon'ya active in Japan. They often performed on black markets. Many stores also moved from a street stall to fixed locations, generating business for chindon'ya, as did the rise of the pachinko business. One well known group in Osaka was Aozora Gakudan, founded by former actor Saeki Yosan. This group played with up to 18 members, and many other chindon'ya joined the group. The introduction of TV and radio advertising had only a small effect on the chindon'ya, as these new mediums were too expensive for the small shops that used the chindon'ya services, and not targeted enough for the customers living nearby the stores.

=== Decline ===
Since the 1960s the number of chindon'ya has declined again, accelerated by the 1973 oil crisis with the subsequent recession. Around 1970, street performances were also banned in many large cities, as they hindered the traffic. In 1985 there remained around 150 chindon'ya, with an average age of about 60 years. Public performances were also banned for several months during the illness and the death of emperor Hirohito in 1989.

== Present ==
A chindon'ya group performing at the 2015 Waseda University graduation

Nowadays chindon'ya are a rare sight in Japanese cities, and only 30–35 professional chindon'ya (puro no chindon'ya) still exist, mostly in and around Tokyo, with another 30 amateur and hobby chindon'ya (shirōto chindon'ya) performing at festivals. In recent years, however, there seems to be a very small increase again, as they can draw on their historic roots to evoke nostalgia, which has improved the social status of performers. Thus, while far fallen from their golden days, chindon'ya have held on to a small niche in the advertising business in Japan. In Osaka, for example, Chindon Tsūshinsha (ちんどん通信社) performs for clothing stores, politicians, beauty salons, and restaurants, in addition to stage performances at weddings, company parties, and other events. They expand their traditional roles even further and even provide a sort of religious services based on old folk rituals, though they are not in any way priests. They have also performed outside Japan. Another group, Adachi in Fukuoka Prefecture, was formed five years ago and is still doing business, including new attractions, such as playing the saxophone while riding the unicycle, displaying juggling, and balloon modelling performances.

Since 1955, a national contest of chindon'ya bands has been held in Toyama-shi. Each April, dozens of groups join to perform and compete.

Many chindon'ya also use the internet to advertise for their services.

== Performance ==
Chindon'ya are a small number of artists and musicians, both male and female. They are made up of usually at least three people, with some larger groups including 7 people. The first person in the group is called hatamochi or hatadori, carrying the flag and handing out leaflets. This person is followed by the oyakata, who usually carries the chindon drum and a large paper umbrella. As the drum weighs up to 15 kilograms (33 lb), this is the most physically demanding job. Some references call the hatamochi the group leader, while other references call the oyakata the group leader. The third person used to play the shamisen, but may nowadays also use the drum, and hence is known as the doramuya. He is followed by one or more gakkiya that play wind instruments.

Chindon'ya dress in colorful clothes, usually in an eccentric version of traditional Japanese clothing. Women may be dressed in the traditional style, wearing brightly colored kimono and a traditionally-styled wig, as well as heavy oshiroi makeup. Men usually wear their hair in a top knot, although nowadays they are usually wigs, and some may wear fancy hats. They parade through the streets playing various instruments, including both traditional Japanese instruments and western instruments. Usually, one person carries a combined instrument consisting of a small gong (giving the "chin" sound in 'chindon'ya') and two small drums (giving the "don" sound in 'chindon'ya'). Additional instruments by other performers may include a larger drum and a woodwind instrument, as for example a clarinet, a trumpet or a saxophone. They often play traditional Japanese tunes, military marches, or jazz.

Through their performance they try to attract attention to themselves, and more importantly, to the advertising signs and banners they are carrying. These may be boards hanging on the back of the performers or banners and flags hanging from large poles on the back of the performers. Some even carried umbrellas with advertising messages. They advertise for new shops, special sales in shops, the opening of a gaming parlor or pachinko parlors, or for cabarets. They may also distribute flyers.

Nowadays, a performer earns around ¥15,000 per day (roughly US$150), working from around 10:30 to 17:00. Hence a typical group of three to four people costs around ¥45,000 to ¥60,000 per day (roughly $450 to $600). Only an estimated 10%-20% of the acts are ordered by shops, most performances are at festivals and private parties.

== Language references ==
"Chindon'ya" is also a colloquial derogatory term meaning "an elaborate showy parade or scene made specifically to divert attention away from some scam", as in 'Nani Kono Chindonya' ("What the hell are they trying to pull?") It can be applied to anything nowadays, but especially politics and commerce. It references to the commonly held view that chindon'ya were very low status, very poor and, therefore, untrustworthy.
