= China Beach Surf Club =

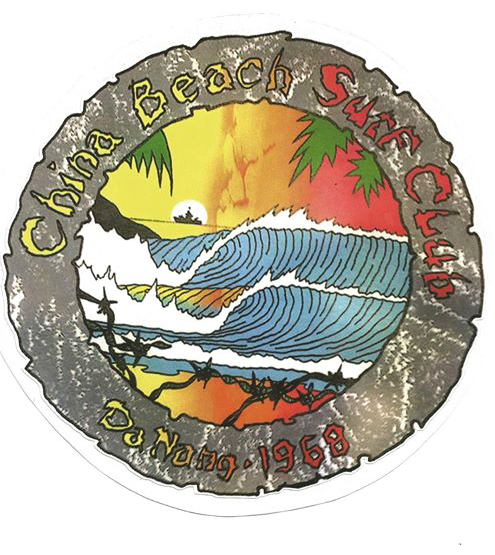
- Founded: 1967
- Founder: Larry Martin
- Founded at: Da Nang, Vietnam
- Dissolved: 1969
- Region served: Vietnam
- Members: 180

The China Beach Surf Club was an unofficial U.S. Military association founded in 1967 in Da Nang, Vietnam and grew into a major cultural and therapeutic outlet for young G.I.s to surf during R&R (military) back from the front lines of the Vietnam War. The beach was referred to as China Beach, but technically was My Khe and marked the first time U.S. troops officially set foot in Vietnam when 3,500 soldiers disembarked there in 1965. What started initially as a small lifeguard outpost, grew into a major surf club with soldiers bringing surfboards back from the states. Today these iconic sixties era surfboards made by Hobie's Hobart Alter and DEXTRA surfboards shaped by Dale Velzy are featured in surf museums across the United States and featured heavily as props in the late 80's drama China Beach which focused on the stories and adventures of an evacuation hospital in Da Nang, Vietnam. Today, a full-size model of the China Beach Surf Club sits in the California Surf Museum

== History ==
The China Beach surfboard was started when Larry Martin served as a storekeeper in the US Navy, and made friends with the lifeguards at the life-guard station, and obtained permission from his superior officer to organize the club, agreeing to repair surfboards and augment lifeguard duties. The club grew rapidly from there, with soldiers coming back from the front lines and looking for leisure activities after the Tet Offensive. With surfboards difficult to come by, Martin began giving lessons and issuing board rental cards to people that could surf.

== In popular culture ==
The China Beach Surf Club became legendary within the surf and military community, and helped form the basis for the laid back surfing soldier in Vietnam archetype. Surfboards and surfing soldiers featured prominently in Apocalypse Now with Lt. Kilgore surfing before and after raids, and the iconic surf setting also featured prominently in the eighties show China Beach, with both Hobie and DEXTRA surfboards featured in advertising with cast members.

== Legacy ==
The legacy of the China Beach Surf Club remains visible with the advent of social networking, many of the former club members have reformed the group online and regularly travel back to Vietnam to surf on "China Beach". Several full-size renderings of the life guard station are featured exhibits at surf museums across the country and the 2019 documentary Back to China Beach chronicled the club's rise and ultimate disbandment as the war receded.

== See also ==
- History of surfing
- Vietnam War
