= One (Bonnie Pink album) =

Studio album by Bonnie Pink
- Released: May 13, 2009
- Recorded: 2008–2009
- Genre: Pop rock
- Length: 63:08
- Label: Warner Music Japan
- Producer: Martin Terefe(#1, 2, 4, 9, 12); Jocko Apa(#3, 8); Track & Field(#5, 10, 14); Burning Chicken(#6, 11, 13, 15); Bonnie Pink(#6, 7, 15)

Bonnie Pink chronology
| Chain (2008) | One (2009) | Dear Diary (2010) |

Singles from One
- 1. "Ring a Bell" Released: April 16, 2008; 2. "Kane wo Narashite" Released: August 6, 2008; 3. "Joy / Happy Ending" Released: April 8, 2009

One is Bonnie Pink's tenth studio album released under the Warner Music Japan label on May 13, 2009. This album was recorded in London, Stockholm, Los Angeles, Malmö, and Tokyo.

== Release ==
"Ring a Bell" is the first single taken from One. Initially released in English as a digital single on April 16, 2008, the song was re-released in Japanese as a full-length single, retitled "Kane o Narashite" (鐘を鳴らして), on August 6, 2008. The song was used as the theme song for the Namco game Tales of Vesperia, with the English version of the song used for the game's overseas release. The song was one of Bonnie Pink's most commercially successful singles, with the Japanese-language version selling over 250,000 digital downloads in Japan, becoming Platinum certified by the RIAJ.

== Track listing ==
All tracks are written by Bonnie Pink, except #9 (written with Craig David).

CD
| No. | Title | Arranger(s) | Length |
|---|---|---|---|
| 1. | "Won't Let You Go" |
| 2. | "fyewsha fyewsha fyewsha" | David Davidson |
| 3. | "Princess Incognito" |
| 4. | "Joy" | David Davidson |
| 5. | "Moso Lover (妄想Lover; Delusional Lover)" |
| 6. | "Kane wo Narashite (鐘を鳴らして; Ring a Bell)" | Burning Chicken |
| 7. | "One Last Time" |
| 8. | "Rock You Till the Dawn" |
| 9. | "Fed Up feat. Craig David" |
| 10. | "Play & Pause" |
| 11. | "himitszu (秘密; Secret)" |
| 12. | "Try Me Out" |
| 13. | "Happy Ending" |
| 14. | "Get on the Bus" |

Bonus track
| No. | Title | Arranger(s) | Length |
|---|---|---|---|
| 15. | "Ring a Bell" | Burning Chicken |
| Total length: | | | 63:08 |

DVD: Bonnie Pink Premium Christmas Night at Billboard Live TOKYO
| No. | Title | Director(s) | Length |
|---|---|---|---|
| 1. | "Chain" | Go Matsumoto |
| 2. | "Last Kiss" | Go Matsumoto |
| 3. | "Tonight, the Night" | Go Matsumoto |

DVD: Music video
| No. | Title | Director(s) | Length |
|---|---|---|---|
| 1. | "Kane o Narashite" (original version) | Go Matsumoto |
| 2. | "Chain" | Go Matsumoto |
| 3. | "Joy" | Go Matsumoto |

DVD: Bonus track
| No. | Title | Length |
|---|---|---|
| 1. | "bonus track off shot !!! "ONE"" |

== Ring a Bell Chart rankings ==
| Chart (2008) | Peak position |
|---|---|
| Japan Billboard Adult Contemporary Airplay | 17 |
| Japan Billboard Japan Hot 100 | 3 |
| Japan Oricon weekly singles | 9 |

=== Ring a Bell: Sales and certifications ===
| Chart | Amount |
|---|---|
| Oricon physical sales | 33,000 |
| RIAJ digital certification | Platinum (250,000+) |

== Release history for Ring a Bell ==
| Region | Date | Format | Distributing Label | Catalogue codes |
|---|---|---|---|---|
| Japan | April 16, 2008 | Digital download ("Ring a Bell") | Warner Music Japan | |
| Japan | August 6, 2008 | Digital download, CD single, rental single ("Kane o Narashite") | Warner Music Japan | WPZL-30098/9 |
