= Present (Bonnie Pink album) =

Studio album by Bonnie Pink
- Released: February 19, 2003
- Recorded: 2002–2003
- Genre: Soul; funk; R&B
- Length: 50:13
- Label: Warner Music Japan
- Producer: Matt Cooper (Outside, Incognito); Bonnie Pink; Tore Johansson (#1)

Bonnie Pink chronology
re*PINK (2002)	Present (2003)	Pink in Red Live (2003)

Singles from Present
- 1. "Tonight, the Night" Released: January 22, 2003

"Present" was Bonnie Pink's sixth studio album released under the Warner Music Japan label on February 19, 2003.

== Track listing ==
All tracks are written by Bonnie Pink.

CD
No.	Title	Arranger(s)	Length
1.	"Tonight, the Night"	Tore Johansson
2.	"Losing Myself"
3.	"Present"	Strings arrangements: Matt Cooper & Simon Hale
4.	"Need You"	Matt Cooper
5.	"Home"
6.	"Rope Dancer"	Strings arrangements: Matt Cooper & Simon Hale
7.	"Over the Brown Bridge"
8.	"Can't Get Enough"
9.	"Passive-Progressivism"
10.	"Chronic Vertigo"
11.	"Wildflower"
12.	"April Shower ~Shigatsu no Arashi~ (April Shower ~四月の嵐~)"
Total length:			50:13

== Charts ==
=== Album ===
Chart	Peak position
Oricon Weekly Chart	#8

=== Single ===
Date	Title	Peak position
January 22, 2003	"Tonight, the Night"	#29
