= Thinking Out Loud (Bonnie Pink album) =

Studio album by Bonnie Pink
- Released: July 25, 2007
- Recorded: 2006–2007
- Genre: Pop rock
- Length: 46:58
- Label: Warner Music Japan/Warner Music Sweden
- Producer: Burning Chicken; Bonnie Pink; Shinya Okuno (Soul Flower Union)

Bonnie Pink chronology
Every Single Day: Complete Bonnie Pink (1995–2006) (2006)	Thinking Out Loud (2007)	Chain (2008)

Singles from Thinking Out Loud
- 1. "A Perfect Sky" Released: June 28, 2006; 2. "Anything for You" Released: March 28, 2007; 3. "Water Me" Released: June 6, 2007

Thinking Out Loud is Bonnie Pink's ninth studio album released under the Warner Music Japan label on July 25, 2007.

== Track listing ==
All tracks are written by Bonnie Pink

No.	Title	Arranger(s)	Length
1.	"Gimme a Beat"	Burning Chicken
2.	"Broken Hearts, Citylights and Me Just Thinking Out Loud"	Burning Chicken
3.	"Burning Inside"	Burning Chicken
4.	"Nagusami Blue (慰みブルー; Blue Amusement)"	Burning Chicken
5.	"Imagination"	Burning Chicken
6.	"A Perfect Sky" (Philharmonic Flava)	Burning Chicken
7.	"Lullaby"	Burning Chicken
8.	"Sakamichi (坂道; Slope)"	Burning Chicken
9.	"Water Me"	Shinya Okuno
10.	"Catch the Sun"	Burning Chicken
11.	"Chances Are"	Burning Chicken
12.	"Anything for You"	Burning Chicken, Bonnie Pink

Bonus track in Sweden version
No.	Title	Remix	Length
13.	"A Perfect Sky" (Björn Remix)	Bjorn Yttling
Total length:			46:58

== Charts ==
=== Album ===
Chart	Peak position
Japanese Albums (Oricon)	5

=== Singles ===
Date	Title	Peak position
June 28, 2006	"A Perfect Sky"	5
March 28, 2007	"Anything for You"	9
June 6, 2007	"Water Me"	8
