= Even So =

Studio album by Bonnie Pink
- Released: May 12, 2004
- Recorded: 2003–2004
- Genre: R&B; soul; pop rock
- Length: 47:32
- Label: Warner Music Japan
- Producer: Tore Johansson; Bonnie Pink

Bonnie Pink chronology
| Pink in Red Live (2003) | Even So (2004) | Reminiscence (2005) |

Singles from Even So
- 1. "Private Laughter" Released: January 21, 2004; 2. "Last Kiss" Released: April 7, 2004

Even So was the seventh studio album by Japanese singer-songwriter Bonnie Pink, released on the Warner Music Japan label on May 12, 2004.

== Track listing ==
All tracks are written by Bonnie Pink, arranged by Tore Johansson.

CD
| No. | Title | Length |
|---|---|---|
| 1. | "Private Laughter" | 2:59 |
| 2. | "Ocean" | 3:20 |
| 3. | "New Dawn" | 4:26 |
| 4. | "5 More Minutes" | 3:21 |
| 5. | "The Answer: Hitotsu ni Naru Toki(The Answer ~ひとつになる時~; The Answer ~When Set to One~)" | 3:30 |
| 6. | "I Just Want You to be Happy" | 4:00 |
| 7. | "Mint" | 4:21 |
| 8. | "1・2・3" | 4:16 |
| 9. | "Last Kiss" | 4:24 |
| 10. | "Walk With You" | 3:56 |
| 11. | "Jinsei Game (人生ゲーム; The Game of Life)" | 4:26 |
| 12. | "Bedtime Story" | 4:33 |
| Total length: | | 47:32 |

== Charts ==
=== Album ===
| Chart | Peak position |
|---|---|
| Oricon Weekly Chart | 4 |

=== Singles ===
| Date | Title | Peak position |
|---|---|---|
| January 21, 2004 | "Private Laughter" | 30 |
| April 7, 2004 | "Last Kiss" | 24 |
