= Just a Girl (album) =

Studio album by Bonnie Pink
- Released: October 24, 2001
- Recorded: 2001
- Genre: Soul; funk; R&B
- Length: 51:14
- Label: East West Japan/Warner Music Japan
- Producer: Bonnie Pink; Motoki Matsuoka; Shinya Okuno (Soul Flower Union); Shigekazu Aida (FOE, EL-MALO); Masato Suzuki (Little Creatures); Anthony Johnson

Bonnie Pink chronology
Let Go (2000)	Just a Girl (2001)	re*PINK (2002)

Singles from Just a Girl
- 1. "Take Me In" Released: February 7, 2001; 2. "Thinking of You" Released: May 9, 2001; 3. "Nemurenai Yoru" Released: August 21, 2001

Just a Girl is Bonnie Pink's fifth studio album under the East West Japan label, released on October 24, 2001.

== Track listing ==
All tracks are written by Bonnie Pink.

CD
No.	Title	Arranger(s)	Length
1.	"Sweet"	Bonnie Pink, Motoki Matsuoka, Shinya Okuno
2.	"Communication"	Bonnie Pink, Shigekazu Aida
3.	"Building a Castle"	Bonnie Pink
4.	"Thinking of You" (Album Mix)	Bonnie Pink, Motoki Matsuoka, Shinya Okuno
5.	"Coin"	Bonnie Pink, Masato Suzuki
6.	"Live Life" (Interlude)	Bonnie Pink
7.	"Saisei (再生; Regeneration)"	Bonnie Pink, Motoki Matsuoka, Shinya Okuno
8.	"Take Me In"	Bonnie Pink, Anthony Johnson
9.	"Are You Sure?"	Bonnie Pink, Motoki Matsuoka, Shinya Okuno
10.	"Movin' On"	Bonnie Pink, Masato Suzuki
11.	"Boku ja Nakatta nara (僕じゃなかったなら; If I Was Not I)"	Bonnie Pink, Shigekazu Aida
12.	"Nemurenai Yoru (Album Mix) (眠れない夜; Sleepless Nights)" (Album Mix)	Bonnie Pink, Motoki Matsuoka
13.	"Just a Girl"	Bonnie Pink, Motoki Matsuoka, Shinya Okuno
Total length:			51:14

== Charts ==
=== Album ===
Chart	Peak position	Sales total	Chart run
Oricon Daily Chart			
Oricon Weekly Chart	#11		
Oricon Monthly Chart			
Oricon Yearly Chart			

=== Singles ===
Date	Title	Peak position	Weeks	Sales
February 7, 2001	"Take Me In"	#30		
May 9, 2001	"Thinking of You"	#28		
August 21, 2001	"Nemurenai Yoru"	#56		
