= Soul Flower Union =

Japanese musical group

Soul Flower Union, also known as SFU, was a Japanese musical group that incorporates Asian styles and world music styles into a rock and roll band. They are known for their blend of psychedelic, rock, Okinawan music, Celtic music, chindon (a kind of Japanese street music), swing jazz, as well as Japanese, Chinese and Korean folk musics. Most of their songs are written and performed in Japanese, although they are fond of using phrases from a number of other languages, including English, French, Italian, Korean, Arabic and Ainu (the language of the native people of Hokkaido, Japan).

== History ==
=== Beginning ===
Soul Flower Union was formed in 1993 in Osaka. Two members from two different punk bands, Mescaline Drive and Newest Model, joined together to form Soul Flower Union. Takashi Nakagawa was from the group Newest Model and brought the "punk" to the group. From Mescaline Drive was Hideko Itami who brought the glam rock to the Soul Flower Union. Other members of both bands also participated in the original lineup of Soul Flower Union.

=== Events ===
SFU have played in front of numerous crowds, with as many as 60,000 people. After the Kobe earthquake in 1995 the group began to play in the streets of the city in order to cheer people up with their music and played about 50 or 60 times during this event. Because they were in the streets they were forced to go "unplugged" and play acoustic versions of their songs, The drums were exchanged for the Korean janggu drum and they also used clarinets, chindon drums, and the accordion as well as putting Okinawan sanshins in place of the electric guitars. This acoustic unit was named Soul Flower Mononoke Summit and is still active as a side project of SFU.

During this time the song 'Mangetsu no Yube' was written (and co-written by Hiroshi Yamaguchi of the group Heatwave) for the victims of the earthquake. Since the earthquake the group has been a huge hit at summer festivals around the area. They also founded a charity fund, The Soul Flower Earthquake Fund, in order to help with the elderly and handicap victims of the earthquake.

Soul Flower Union was the first Japanese band to play in South Korea following a lifting of a band on Japanese music in the late 1990s. Soul Flower Mononoke Summit has played in a number of rather unusual places, including North Korea, East Timor, the infamous landfill in the Philippines known as Smokey Mountain, as well as Palestinian refugee camps in Jordan. They have also toured in more ordinary places like Taiwan and France.

=== Politics ===
SFU and Soul Flower Mononoke Summit are extremely political bands, and have supported a number of causes in Japan and around the world, with a special focus on the rights of minority peoples and on anti-war activity. In Japan, they have supported the Okinawan, Ainu, Korean, Chinese, and Buraku people. They have covered a number of songs from the cultures of those minority groups. Their 2001 album "Screwball Comedy" included a song called "No to Ieru Otoko" ("The Man Who Can Say No) that taunted the nationalist governor of Tokyo, Shintaro Ishihara, who once wrote a book called "The Japan That Can Say No."

Worldwide, they have been strong supporters of East Timorese independence. They have visited East Timor and played concerts there, and their 2005 album, Lorosae Mon Amour, was dedicated to East Timor. They have also supported the cause of Palestinian independence, and have played in a Palestinian refugee camp in Jordan. Recent albums have contained songs sharply critical of the Iraq war. Another recent cause that they have been active in has been the anti-US base movement in Okinawan.

They have also recorded versions of left wing anthem The Internationale.

Despite the strong political influence, SFU also writes love songs, humorous songs, and philosophical songs.

=== Influences ===
Tradition plays a key role in the music of Soul Flower Union. When America won the war many people looked to American culture, and turned away from their own tradition. Many Japanese people no longer recognize the traditional music from Japan, but SFU is trying to bring that back to the people with a new style which sets them apart from the other bands.

Soul Flower Union is influenced by the people of the Japanese Islands and the Okinawan Islands as well as many other cultures found in Japan, including the Ainu (the native people of Hokkaido, Japan), Korea, and China. They are also influenced by a variety of world music, including Celtic, reggae, Arabic music, and swing jazz.

=== Hiatus ===
On 2025 December 26th, SFU announced their hiatus.

== Members ==
There are seven official members of Soul Flower Union, although they often have regular guests who help them perform on tours. Takashi Nakagawa is the band leader and does vocals, guitar, and sanshin. Hiroshi Kawamura plays slide guitar, guitar and mandolin, Shinya Okuno plays keyboards and accordion, Kohki plays the drums and Jigen plays the bass. The newest member, Mihoko Kamimura, does backing vocals and "hayashi kotoba" call-and-response vocals, plus occasional lead vocals and percussion. Founding member Hideko Itami sings "hayashi" and plays various kinds of Japanese, Okinawan and Korea percussion instruments. However, Itami often does not appear in SFU's live concerts anymore, as she suffers from tinnitus, which makes it harder for her to play amplified live music. As a result, these days she concentrates mostly on Soul Flower Mononoke Summit, although she still appears on SFU's studio albums and in high-profile gigs.

Their most common guest musicians include former member Yoko Utsumi (backing vocals, lead vocals and Japanese percussion instruments) and Hino Nobuko (sax, clarinet). In the past, clarinet player and Chin-Don musician Okuma Wataru was a frequent collaborator and sometimes member of SFU, and he still plays in Soul Flower Mononoke Summit. Violinist Keisuke Ota also frequently appeared in Soul Flower Union's past albums and live shows. Keyboardist/accordionist Rikuo has played on many of the band's albums, and is a regular member of the acoustic offshoot group Soul Flower Acoustic Partisan, along with Nakagasa and Okuma. SFU have also collaborated with, and been produced by, Dónal Lunny who was married to Hideko Itami from 2002 to c. 2010. Lunny is an Irish trad/folk bouzouki player. He has helped strengthen the band's focus on traditional Okinawan music, and has also been a major force in their strong Irish/Celtic influence.

Soul Flower Mononoke Summit has a somewhat different membership from Soul Flower Union nowadays, including some members that no longer play in SFU. The current lineup is as follows: Takashi Nakagawa (lead vocals, sanshin), Hideko Itami (backing vocals, hayashi, taiko, other Japanese percussion instruments), Shinya Okuno (accordion), Hiroshi Kawamura(bass), Yoko Utsumi (backing vocals, hayashi, taiko, other Japanese percussion instruments), Wataru Okuma(clarinet), Nobuko Hino (sax, clarinet), and Natsuki Nakamura (Okinawan taiko, backing vocals, lead vocals, hayashi, and sanshin).

== Discography ==
The group has produced a total of 12 original albums as well as one live album and four best-of compilations. Three additional albums have come out under the Soul Flower Mononoke Summit name. Sony produced their first two albums but when their third album came around Sony refused to produce it because of controversial lyric content, which criticized the Japanese government for its response to the earthquake, and for ignoring the plight of ethnic minorities affected by the earthquake.

Albums

- Kamuy Ipirma (1993)
- Watatsumi Yamatsumi (1994)
- Electro Asyl-Bop (1996)
- Ghost Hits 93-96 (1996)
- Asyl Ching-Dong (1996) — as Soul Flower Mononoke Summit
- Levelers Ching Dong (1997) — as Soul Flower Mononoke Summit
- Marginal Moon (1998) — as Soul Flower with Dónal Lunny Band
- High Tide & Moonlight Bash (1999)
- Winds Fairground (1999)
- Ghost Hits 95-99 (2001)
- Screwball Comedy (2001)
- Love ± Zero (2002)
- Shalom! Salaam! (2003)
- All Quiet on the Far Eastern Front!? (2004)
- Lorosae Mon Amor (2005)
- Deracine Ching Dong (2006) — as Soul Flower Mononoke Summit
- Ghost Hits 00-06 (2006)
- 90's Singles (2008)
- Cante Diaspora (2008)
- Exile on Main Beach (2009)
- Camp Pangaea (2010)
- On the Beach of Miracles (2011)
- Underground Railroad (2014)
- Butterfly Affects (2018)
- Habitable Zone (2020)

Contributing artist

- The Rough Guide to the Music of Japan (1999, World Music Network)
