= Blue Jam (album) =

Studio album by Bonnie Pink
- Released: September 21, 1995
- Recorded: 1995
- Genres: Indie pop; blues; jazz
- Length: 40:51
- Label: Love Lite / Stone Fox (Pony Canyon)
- Producer: Yasushi Ide (King Cobra Ltd.)

Bonnie Pink chronology
Blue Jam (1995)	Heaven's Kitchen (1997)

Singles from Blue Jam
- 1. "Orenji" Released: October 20, 1995

"Blue Jam" was Japanese singer Bonnie Pink's debut album. It spawned one single but failed to chart. In the jacket of the album, she describes the album as a "mixture of bitter honey, blues music, momentary silence, irresistible madness, teardrops, sourgrapes, hopeful bombs, big big love, and a few green apples." The album introduced her unique style of music that has been defined as an off-beat mix between jazz, blues, pop, and rock.

== Track listing ==
All tracks are written by Kaori Asada.

CD
No.	Title	Arranger(s)	Length
1.	"Scarecrow"	Tomio Inoue	4:21
2.	"Curious Baby"	Tomio Inoue	4:47
3.	"Candy Futatsu no Sanpo (キャンディ2つの散歩; Walk with two candies)"	Ryutaro Kihara	4:38
4.	"Senaka (背中; His Back)"	Bun Matsuda	3:49
5.	"Freak"	SuGar Yoshinaga&Yumiko Ohno (from Buffalo Daughter)	5:23
6.	"Too Young to Stop Loving"	Hiroshi Egaitsu, Toru Matsuoka	4:41
7.	"Maze of Love"	Tomio Inoue	7:16
8.	"Orange"	Tomio Inoue	5:51
Total length:			40:51
