= Let Go (Bonnie Pink album) =

Studio album by Bonnie Pink
- Released: April 5, 2000
- Recorded: 2000
- Genre: Indie pop; blues; jazz
- Length: 48:53
- Label: East West Japan/Warner Music Japan
- Producer: Mitchell Froom, Bonnie Pink

Bonnie Pink chronology
Bonnie's Kitchen 2 (1999)	Let Go (2000)	Just a Girl (2001)

Singles from Let Go
- 1. "You Are Blue, So Am I" Released: March 1, 2000; 2. "Fish" Released: April 5, 2000; 3. "Kako to Genjitsu" Released: June 7, 2000; 4. "Sleeping Child" Released: July 12, 2000

Professional ratings
Review scores
Source	Rating
AllMusic	2.5/5 stars

"Let Go" was Bonnie Pink's fourth studio album released under the East West Japan label on April 5, 2000. It was recorded in Hollywood, California, and produced by Bonnie Pink and Mitchell Froom.

== Track listing ==
All tracks are written by Bonnie Pink.

CD
No.	Title	Length
1.	"Sleeping Child"
2.	"Fish"
3.	"Trust"
4.	"Reason"
5.	"Kako to Genjitsu (過去と現実; The Past and Reality)"
6.	"Tears for Leo"
7.	"Call My Name"
8.	"Run with Yourself"
9.	"Shine"
10.	"Shadow"
11.	"Rumblefish"
12.	"You Are Blue, So Am I"
13.	"Refrain" (Instrumental)
Total length:		48:53

== Charts ==
=== Album ===
Chart	Peak position	Sales total	Chart run
Oricon Daily Chart			
Oricon Weekly Chart	#10		
Oricon Monthly Chart			
Oricon Yearly Chart			

=== Singles ===
Date	Title	Peak position	Weeks	Sales
March 1, 2000	"You Are Blue, So Am I"	#24		
April 5, 2000	"Fish"			
June 7, 2000	"Kako to Genjitsu"	#80		
July 12, 2000	"Sleeping Child"			
