= Evil and Flowers =

Evil & Flowers

Studio album by Bonnie Pink
- Released: April 17, 1998
- Recorded: 1998 in Sweden
- Genre: Soft rock; downtempo
- Length: 45:39
- Label: Stone Fox (Pony Canyon)
- Producer: Tore Johansson

Bonnie Pink chronology
Heaven's Kitchen (1997)	Evil & Flowers (1998)	Bonnie's Kitchen 1 (1999)

Singles from Evil & Flowers
- 1. "Forget Me Not" Released: March 4, 1998; 2. "Kingyo" Released: May 20, 1998; 3. "e.p." Released: May 20, 1998; 4. "Inu to Tsuki" Released: October 21, 1998

"Evil & Flowers" is a studio album by Bonnie Pink, released in 1998.

== Track listing ==
All tracks are written by Bonnie Pink, arranged by Tore Johansson. Strings Arrangement: Tore Yohanson (#5, #13).

CD
No.	Title	Length
1.	"Evil & Flowers (Piano Version)"	2:27
2.	"Forget Me Not"	4:06
3.	"Your Butterfly"	3:04
4.	"Hickey Hickey"	2:50
5.	"He"	3:28
6.	"Eve's Apple"	3:54
7.	"Kingyo (金魚; Goldfish)"	5:06
8.	"Meddler"	3:30
9.	"Masquerade"	2:29
10.	"Quiet Life"	3:42
11.	"Only for Him"	5:30
12.	"Fallen Sun"	2:55
13.	"Evil & Flowers"	2:38

== Charts ==
=== Album ===
Chart	Peak position	Sales total	Chart run
Oricon Daily Chart			
Oricon Weekly Chart	4		
Oricon Monthly Chart			
Oricon Yearly Chart			

=== Singles ===
Date	Title	Peak position	Weeks	Sales
March 4, 1998	"Forget Me Not"	48		
May 20, 1998	"Kingyo"			
May 20, 1998	"E.p."			
October 21, 1998	"Inu to Tsuki"	15		
