= Heaven's Kitchen =

Studio album by Bonnie Pink
- Released: May 16, 1997
- Recorded: 1996–1997 in Sweden
- Genre: Indie pop; blues; jazz
- Length: 49:22
- Label: Love Lite/Stone Fox (Pony Canyon)
- Producer: Tore Johansson

Bonnie Pink chronology
Blue Jam (1995)	Heaven's Kitchen (1997)	Evil & Flowers (1998)

Singles from Heaven's Kitchen
- 1. "Do You Crash?" Released: September 20, 1996; 2. "Heaven's Kitchen" Released: April 18, 1997; 3. "It's Gonna Rain!" Released: June 18, 1997; 4. "Lie Lie Lie" Released: October 3, 1997

"Heaven's Kitchen" was Bonnie Pink's second album released under the Pony Canyon label on May 16, 1997. This album was produced by Tore Johansson following the single Do You Crash?. The album was rereleased on HQCD and vinyl in 2016 to commemorate the 20th anniversary of Bonnie Pink's debut and then released on colored vinyl in November 2022 as part of the Toyokasei Company's Record Day.

== Reception ==
Reviewing the album for AllMusic, Ted Mills was positive, writing that "the first four tracks are probably the strongest opening of any Japanese rock record in years" and called it "a hidden treasure of a pop album."

== Track listing ==
All tracks are written by Bonnie Pink, arranged by Tore Johansson.

CD
No.	Title	Length
1.	"Heaven’s Kitchen"
2.	"Hohoemi no Kate (ほほえみの糧; Food of Smile)"
3.	"It's Gonna Rain!"	4:35
4.	"Do You Crash?"
5.	"Silence"
6.	"Mad Afternoon"
7.	"Lie Lie Lie"
8.	"Melody"
9.	"Pendulum"
10.	"Get in My Hair"
11.	"Farewell Alcohol River"
12.	"No One Like You"
Total length:		49:22

== Charts ==
=== Album ===
Chart	Peak position	Sales total	Chart run
Oricon Daily Chart			
Oricon Weekly Chart	#8		
Oricon Monthly Chart			
Oricon Yearly Chart			
Billboard Japan Hot Albums	#92		
Billboard Japan Top Album Sales	#41		

=== Singles ===
Date	Title	Peak position	Weeks	Sales
September 20, 1996	"Do You Crash?"			
April 18, 1997	"Heaven's Kitchen"	#50		
June 18, 1997	"It's Gonna Rain!"	#40		
October 3, 1997	"Lie Lie Lie"			
