= Bonnie Pink =

Japanese singer-songwriter and musician (born 1973)

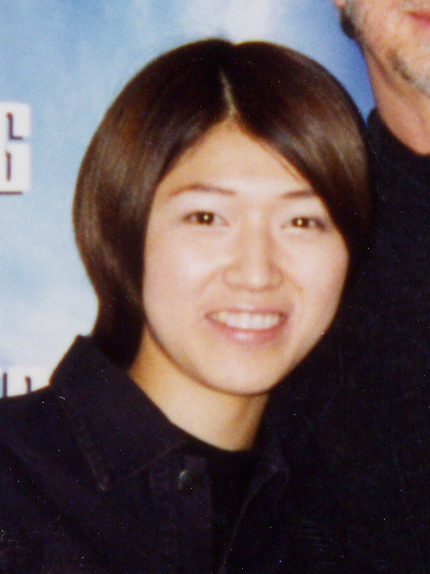
- Born: Kaori Asada (浅田 香織); 16 April 1973 (age 53); Nantan, Kyoto, Japan
- Occupations: Singer-songwriter, musician
- Years active: 1994–present
- Musical career
- Also known as: Bonnie Pink
- Genres: Pop rock; R&B; soul; funk; blues; jazz; downtempo
- Instruments: Vocals, guitar, piano
- Labels: Pony Canyon (1995–1998); Warner Music Japan (1999–present); Pinxter (indie record label, 2003–present); Taisuke (talent agency)
- Website: bonniepink.jp

Kaori Asada (浅田 香織, Asada Kaori; born 16 April 1973), known by her stage name Bonnie Pink, is a Japanese singer-songwriter and musician. She writes and composes all her songs, and plays guitar and piano. Asada has said that the name Bonnie Pink is random and has no special meaning; she chose it because it was easy to remember and because she thought the words were cute together.

== History ==
Bonnie Pink debuted in 1995 with the single "Orenji", under her real name, Asada Kaori. Her first album, Blue Jam, was released that same year under the Pony Canyon record label. She described it as a "mixture of bitter honey, blues music, momentary silence, irresistible madness, teardrops, sour grapes, hopeful bombs, big big love, and a few green apples" in the jacket. It introduced her unique style of music that has been defined as an off-beat mix between jazz, blues, and pop rock. The next year Bonnie Pink produced an album together with artists Tore Johansson, Swedish producer for The Cardigans, and Mitchell Froom. The song "It's Gonna Rain!" was the fifth ending of the popular Rurouni Kenshin anime. She wrote her third album, Evil & Flowers (1998), while in isolation in the Swedish countryside. She hoped to find inspiration there, but became depressed. She put her feelings of frustration into the songs. She went to New York alone to take a vacation and to study music after having released her third album in 1998. She went back in 1999 and contracted with Warner Music Japan.

=== Let Go ===
On her fourth album, Let Go, she worked with Mitchell Froom, New York producer of Elvis Costello, Cibo Matto, and Suzanne Vega. He gave her co-production credit for the album because he was so impressed with her. Her fifth album, Just a Girl, came out in 2001. The next year she collaborated with other artists and released Re-Pink, a remix album. Present came out in 2003 and Even So in 2004. Golden Tears, which features the single "So Wonderful", came out in 2005, and she performed at SXSW that same year as part of Japan Nite.

=== "Love Is Bubble" ===
Bonnie Pink released the single "Love Is Bubble" in May 2006. Her June 2006 single "A Perfect Sky", featured in an Anessa makeup commercial with popular model Yuri Ebihara, reached number 5 on the Oricon singles charts, making it the most successful single in Bonnie Pink's career. Her "best of" album sold out quickly on Amazon Japan and reached number two on the Oricon charts and continued to chart in the top 30 becoming one of the top selling albums of the year. In November 2006, she was featured in M-Flo's single "Love Song". The single was a hit for both M-Flo and Bonnie Pink, and debuted at number 7 on the Oricon daily charts and reached number 9 on the Oricon weekly chart, gaining Bonnie Pink another top 10 single.

=== Themes for anime ===
Her song "Cotton Candy" was used as the ending theme for the anime Guyver: The Bioboosted Armor in 2005, and "Love Is Bubble" was the theme song for the Japanese movie Memories of Matsuko, in which she also featured. Her single "Last Kiss", which appears as the last song on her greatest hits album, was the ending theme to the popular Gantz anime.

=== "Anything for You" ===
Bonnie Pink's single "Anything for You", although not as successful as "A Perfect Sky", still reached number 9 on the Oricon charts, achieving moderate success. Bonnie Pink, shortly after releasing her previous single, began performing on popular TV music shows and promoting her latest single, "Water Me", which was the theme song for the popular TV drama Watashitachi no Kyōkasho ("Our Textbooks") a dark, melancholy drama about a young girl's suicide and the effect on her school. The single "Water Me" reached number 6 on Oricon on its release date and number 8 on the weekly charts. On 7 July 2007, Bonnie Pink performed at Live Earth in Kyoto.

=== Thinking Out Loud ===
Bonnie Pink's album Thinking Out Loud was released on 25 July 2007, her first album to be sold in both CD and CD+DVD formats. The first press of both editions came with an access ticket containing the AD/Password to reserve tickets for her tour, "Bonnie Pink Tour 2007 'Thinking Out Loud' Final at Nippon Budokan" on a special designated website. The CD pre-orders made the album number 1 on the Amazon.com Japan Top Sellers. The album debuted at number 4 on the Oricon Daily Charts and number 5 on the weekly charts selling approximately 53,605 copies. As of 5 September 2007, her album had sold approximately 90,000 copies. Bonnie Pink was on her "Thinking Out Loud Tour" from late 2007 to early 2008.

=== I and Ai ===
In April 2008, Bonnie Pink made a guest performances for Domoto Tsuyoshi's solo project 244 Endli-x album I and Ai. She was featured on the last track, "Say Anything", which she wrote the lyrics to with Domoto.

=== "Ring a Bell" ===
The English version of Bonnie Pink's single "Ring a Bell" was used as the theme song for the American release of the Xbox 360 game Tales of Vesperia. The single was released in Japan and America on iTunes to celebrate Bonnie Pink's 35th birthday. Its Japanese counterpart, "Kane o Narashite", was released on 6 August 2008. Bonnie Pink's thirtieth single, "Joy / Happy Ending", was released on 8 April 2009. One, her 10th studio album, followed on 13 May 2009.

== Discography ==
- Blue Jam (1995)
- Heaven's Kitchen (1997)
- Evil and Flowers (1998)
- Let Go (2000)
- Just a Girl (2001)
- Present (2003)
- Even So (2004)
- Golden Tears (2005)
- Thinking Out Loud (2007)
- One (2009)
- Dear Diary (2010)
- Chasing Hope (2012)
- Infinity (2023)
