= Tore Johansson =

Swedish record producer, composer and musician (born 1959)

- Occupations: Producer; songwriter
- Website: insteadof.se

Tore Johansson (born 6 November 1959) is a Swedish record producer, composer and musician based in Malmö, Sweden.

== Biography ==
In an interview with HitQuarters, Johansson claimed that the main impetus for his becoming a music producer was the lack of good recording studios in the Malmö area at that time in which to record his own band. As a result,

"my friends and me decided to build a studio for recording our own music, and then I started to record other bands here and ended up as an engineer/producer. It wasn’t something I had planned."

Untutored in the art of recording, he acquired his skills through "trial and error". His main inspiration at that time was classic recordings from the 1960s and '70s, and in fact attempted to capture an old style in a conscious reaction against the production methods employed at that time, which he and his friends thought were bad.

His first five years as a producer were largely focused on developing the Swedish indie band The Cardigans, for whom Johansson has produced five of their six albums to date, beginning with the 1994 debut Emmerdale, excluding their fifth studio album Long Gone Before Daylight due to artistic differences. As someone as new to the studio as the band these sessions were an equally valuable learning experience for both parties. According to Johansson, each time they started on a new album, "we sat down and listened to the old album and decided what we liked about it and what we didn't like about it and what direction the new album should go in." More recently, Johansson prefers to write for or co-write with solo artists.

== Production work ==
Johansson has gained particular international recognition through his production work with The Cardigans and Franz Ferdinand, but has also worked with a number of other recording artists such as:

- a-ha
- A Camp
- Anouk
- Nicole Atkins & the Sea
- Mathieu Boogaerts
- Melanie C
- Eggstone
- Sophie Ellis-Bextor
- Tomoyo Harada
- Mayumi Iizuka – Smile×Smile
- Tom Jones
- Kira and The Kindred Spirits
- David Kitt
- The Little Flames
- The Mighty Roars
- OK Go
- New Order
- Bonnie Pink
- The Redwalls
- Remioromen
- Saint Etienne
- Solveig Sandnes
- Suede
- Titiyo
- Emilíana Torrini
- Martha Wainwright
- Wild Beasts
- WIT
- Bertine Zetlitz
- Cia Cia Her
- Åtta Bier ti min far
- As Animals
