= List of songs recorded by Kent =

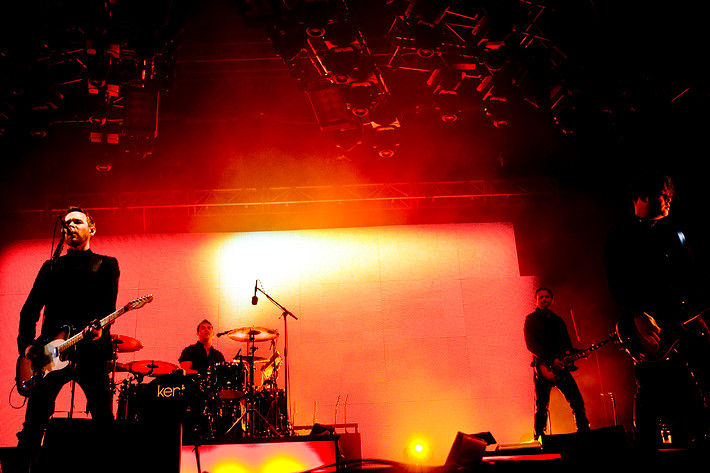
Kent performing in 2008

The following is a list of songs known to have been recorded by Swedish alternative rock band Kent. Between 1995 and 2016, they released 12 studio albums, one EP, three compilation albums, 40 singles and 34 music videos.

With eleven number-one albums, five number-one singles, 22 Swedish Grammy Awards, and over three million record sales, Kent is considered the most popular rock/pop group within Sweden and throughout Scandinavia. Vapen & ammunition (2002) topped the Swedish charts for eight weeks.

== Released songs ==
Name of song, writer(s), original release, and year of release
Title	Writer(s)	Original release	Year	Ref.
"10 minuter (för mig själv)"	Joakim Berg	Verkligen	1996	
"18.29-4"	Joakim Berg; Martin Sköld	Röd	2009	
"2000"	Joakim Berg	non-album single	2009	
"400 slag"	Joakim Berg	Du & jag döden	2005	
"747"	Joakim Berg	Isola	1997	
"999"	Kent	Jag är inte rädd för mörkret	2012	
"Alla mot alla"	Joakim Berg	B-side of "Palace & Main"	2005	
"Allt har sin tid"	Joakim Berg	Tigerdrottningen	2014	
"Andromeda"	Joakim Berg	Då som nu för alltid	2016	
"Ansgar & Evelyne"	Joakim Berg	The hjärta & smärta EP	2005	
"Ärlighet Respekt Kärlek"	Joakim Berg; Martin Sköld	En plats i solen	2010	
"Att presentera ett svin"	Joakim Berg	B-side of "Halka"	1996	
"Avtryck"	Joakim Berg	Verkligen	1996	
"Bas riff"	Joakim Berg	B-side of "Musik non stop"	1999	
"Beredd på allt"	Joakim Berg; Martin Sköld	Jag är inte rädd för mörkret	2012	
"Berg & dalvana"	Joakim Berg	Hagnesta Hill	1999	
"Berlin"	Joakim Berg; Martin Sköld	Tillbaka till samtiden	2007	
"Beskyddaren"	Joakim Berg	Hagnesta Hill	1999	
"Bianca"	Joakim Berg; Martin Sköld	Isola	1997	
"Blåjeans"	Joakim Berg	Kent	1995	
"Celsius"	Joakim Berg	Isola	1997	
"Chans"	Joakim Berg	B-sidor 95–00	2000	
"Columbus"	Joakim Berg; Martin Sköld	Tillbaka till samtiden	2007	
"Cowboys"	Joakim Berg	Hagnesta Hill	1999	
"December"	Joakim Berg	B-side of "Saker man ser"	1998	
"Den andra sidan"	Joakim Berg; Martin Sköld	Tigerdrottningen	2014	
"Den döda vinkeln"	Joakim Berg	Du & jag döden	2005	
"Den osynlige mannen"	Joakim Berg	Kent	1995	
"Den sista sången"	Joakim Berg; Liv Berg; Ava Berg; Sixten Berg	Då som nu för alltid	2016	
"Den vänstra stranden"	Joakim Berg	Då som nu för alltid	2016	
"Det finns inga ord"	Joakim Berg; Martin Sköld	Röd	2009	
"Det kanske kommer en förändring"	Joakim Berg	B-side of "Generation Ex"	2008	
"Din enda vän"	Joakim Berg	Tigerdrottningen	2014	
"Din skugga"	Joakim Berg	B-side of "747"	1998	
"Dom andra"	Joakim Berg	Vapen & ammunition	2002	
"Dom som försvann"	Joakim Berg	The hjärta & smärta EP	2005	
"Du är ånga"	Joakim Berg	Du & jag döden	2005	
"Du var min armé"	Joakim Berg	Du & jag döden	2005	
"Duett"	Joakim Berg	Vapen & ammunition	2002	
"Egoist"	Joakim Berg	non-album single	2016	
"Elefanter"	Joakim Berg	Tillbaka till samtiden	2007	
"Elever"	Joakim Berg	B-side of "747"	1998	
"Elite"	Joakim Berg	Vapen & ammunition	2002	
"Elvis"	Joakim Berg	Isola	1997	
"En helt ny karriär"	Joakim Berg	B-side of "Kräm (så nära får ingen gå)"	1996	
"En himmelsk drog"	Joakim Berg	Hagnesta Hill	1999	
"En timme en minut"	Joakim Berg	Verkligen	1996	
"Ensam lång väg hem"	Joakim Berg	En plats i solen	2010	
"Ensamheten"	Joakim Berg; Martin Sköld	Röd	2009	
"Ensammast i Sverige"	Joakim Berg	Tillbaka till samtiden	2007	
"Ett år utan sommar"	Joakim Berg	B-side of "Tänd på"	2012	
"Ett tidsfördriv att dö för"	Joakim Berg	Hagnesta Hill	1999	
"Falska profeter"	Joakim Berg	Då som nu för alltid	2016	
"Färger på natten"	Joakim Berg	Jag är inte rädd för mörkret	2012	
"FF"	Joakim Berg	Vapen & ammunition	2002	
"Flen/Paris"	Joakim Berg	The hjärta & smärta EP	2005	
"Förlåtelsen"	Joakim Berg	Då som nu för alltid	2016	
"Frank"	Joakim Berg	Kent	1995	
"Gamla Ullevi"	Joakim Berg; Martin Sköld	En plats i solen	2010	
"Generation Ex"	Joakim Berg; Martin Sköld	Tillbaka till samtiden	2007	
"Gigi"	Joakim Berg	Då som nu för alltid	2016	
"Glasäpplen"	Joakim Berg; Martin Sköld	En plats i solen	2010	
"Glider"	Joakim Berg	Isola	1997	
"Godhet"	Joakim Berg	Tigerdrottningen	2014	
"Gravitation"	Joakim Berg	Verkligen	1996	
"Gummiband"	Joakim Berg	B-side of "Halka"	1996	
"Halka"	Joakim Berg	Verkligen	1996	
"Hänsyn"	Kent	Jag är inte rädd för mörkret	2012	
"Hjärta"	Joakim Berg; Martin Sköld	Röd	2009	
"Hur jag fick dig att älska mig"	Joakim Berg	Vapen & ammunition	2002	
"Idioter"	Joakim Berg; Martin Sköld	Röd	2009	
"Indianer"	Joakim Berg	Verkligen	1996	
"Ingen kommer att tro dig"	Joakim Berg	Kent	1995	
"Ingen kunde röra oss"	Joakim Berg	non-album single	2012	
"Ingenting"	Joakim Berg	Tillbaka till samtiden	2007	
"Ingenting någonsin"	Joakim Berg	Kent	1995	
"Innan allting tar slut"	Joakim Berg	Isola	1997	
"Innan himlen faller ner"	Joakim Berg	Tigerdrottningen	2014	
"Insekter"	Joakim Berg	Hagnesta Hill	1999	
"Isis & Bast"	Joakim Berg	Jag är inte rädd för mörkret	2012	
"Ismael"	Joakim Berg; Martin Sköld	En plats i solen	2010	
"Istället för ljud"	Joakim Berg; Martin Sköld	Verkligen	1996	
"Jag ser dig"	Joakim Berg	Jag är inte rädd för mörkret	2012	
"Jag vill inte vara rädd"	Joakim Berg	Kent	1995	
"Järnspöken"	Joakim Berg	Du & jag döden	2005	
"Just like money"	Joakim Berg	Hagnesta Hill	2000	
"Kallt kaffe"	Joakim Berg	B-side of "Frank"	1995	
"Kärleken väntar"	Joakim Berg	Vapen & ammunition	2002	
"Kevlarsjäl"	Joakim Berg	Hagnesta Hill	1999	
"Klåparen"	Joakim Berg; Martin Sköld	Du & jag döden	2005	
"Kräm (så nära får ingen gå)"	Joakim Berg; Martin Sköld	Verkligen	1996	
"Krossa allt"	Joakim Berg; Martin Sköld	Röd	2009	
"Kungen är död"	Joakim Berg; Martin Sköld	Hagnesta Hill	1999	
"La Belle Epoque"	Joakim Berg	Tigerdrottningen	2014	
"Lämnar"	Joakim Berg	B-side of "Kärleken väntar"	2002	
"Längesen vi sågs"	Joakim Berg	B-side of "Saker man ser"	1998	
"Längtan skala 3:1"	Joakim Berg	B-side of "Kevlarsjäl"	2000	
"Låt dom komma"	Joakim Berg; Martin Sköld	Jag är inte rädd för mörkret	2012	
"Livrädd med stil"	Joakim Berg	B-side of "Gravitation"	1996	
"Livräddaren"	Joakim Berg; Martin Sköld	Isola	1997	
"LSD, någon?"	Joakim Berg	Tillbaka till samtiden	2007	
"M"	Joakim Berg	B-side of "Max 500"	2005	
"Månadens erbjudande"	Joakim Berg	The hjärta & smärta EP	2005	
"Mannen i den vita hatten (16 år senare)"	Joakim Berg	Du & jag döden	2005	
"Max 500"	Joakim Berg	Du & jag döden	2005	
"Min värld"	Joakim Berg	B-side of "Ingenting"	2007	
"Minimalen"	Joakim Berg; Martin Sköld	En plats i solen	2010	
"Mirage"	Joakim Berg	Tigerdrottningen	2014	
"Musik non stop"	Joakim Berg	Hagnesta Hill	1999	
"Nålens öga"	Joakim Berg	non-album single	2006	
"När det blåser på månen"	Martin Sköld	Kent	1995	
"Nattpojken & Dagflickan"	Joakim Berg	Då som nu för alltid	2016	
"Nihilisten"	Joakim Berg	B-side of "Palace & Main"	2005	
"Noll"	Joakim Berg	B-side of "En himmelsk drog"	2000	
"Nostromo"	Joakim Berg	Best Of	2016	
"Om du var här"	Joakim Berg	Isola	1997	
"Om du visste vad du ville"	Joakim Berg	Best Of	2016	
"Om gyllene år"	Joakim Berg	B-side of "En himmelsk drog"	2000	
"Önskar att någon..."	Joakim Berg	B-side of "Musik non stop"	1999	
"Oprofessionell"	Joakim Berg	Isola	1997	
"OWC"	Joakim Berg	Isola	1997	
"På drift?"	Joakim Berg	non-album single	2008	
"På nära håll"	Joakim Berg	B-side of "Om du var här"	1997	
"Palace & Main"	Joakim Berg; Martin Sköld	Du & jag döden	2005	
"Pärlor"	Joakim Berg	Vapen & ammunition	2002	
"Passagerare"	Joakim Berg	En plats i solen	2010	
"Petroleum"	Joakim Berg; Martin Sköld	Jag är inte rädd för mörkret	2012	
"Pojken med hålet i handen"	Martin Sköld	Kent	1995	
"Quiet Heart"	Joakim Berg	Hagnesta Hill	2000	
"Revolt III"	Joakim Berg	Hagnesta Hill	1999	
"Rödljus"	Joakim Berg	B-side of "Kräm (så nära får ingen gå)"	1996	
"Romeo återvänder ensam"	Joakim Berg; Martin Sköld	Du & jag döden	2005	
"Rosor & palmblad"	Joakim Berg	Du & jag döden	2005	
"Ruta 1"	Joakim Berg	Jag är inte rädd för mörkret	2012	
"Saker man ser"	Joakim Berg	Isola	1997	
"Silver"	Joakim Berg	Best Of	2016	
"Simmaren"	Joakim Berg	Tigerdrottningen	2014	
"Sjukhus"	Joakim Berg; Martin Sköld	Röd	2009	
"Skisser för sommaren"	Joakim Berg	En plats i solen	2010	
"Skogarna"	Joakim Berg	Tigerdrottningen	2014	
"Skyll inte ifrån dig"	Joakim Berg	Då som nu för alltid	2016	
"Slutsats"	Joakim Berg	B-side of "När det blåser på månen"	1995	
"Socker"	Joakim Berg	Vapen & ammunition	2002	
"Som vatten"	Joakim Berg	Kent	1995	
"Sömnen"	Joakim Berg; Martin Sköld	Tillbaka till samtiden	2007	
"Spökstad"	Joakim Berg	B-sidor 95–00	2000	
"Stanna hos mig"	Joakim Berg	Hagnesta Hill	1999	
"Stenbrott"	Joakim Berg	Kent	1995	
"Stoppa mig juni (Lilla ego)"	Joakim Berg	Hagnesta Hill	1999	
"Sundance kid"	Joakim Berg	Vapen & ammunition	2002	
"Svart snö"	Joakim Berg	Tigerdrottningen	2014	
"Svarta linjer"	Joakim Berg; Martin Sköld	Röd	2009	
"Sverige"	Joakim Berg	Vapen & ammunition	2002	
"Tänd på"	Joakim Berg	Jag är inte rädd för mörkret	2012	
"Taxmannen"	Joakim Berg; Martin Sköld	Röd	2009	
"Team building"	Joakim Berg; Martin Sköld	En plats i solen	2010	
"Tennsoldater"	Joakim Berg	Då som nu för alltid	2016	
"Terapi"	Joakim Berg	Best Of	2016	
"Thinner"	Martin Sköld	Verkligen	1996	
"Tick tack"	Joakim Berg	B-side of "Columbus"	2007	
"Töntarna"	Joakim Berg; Martin Sköld	Röd	2009	
"Utan dina andetag"	Joakim Berg	B-side of "Om du var här"	1997	
"Vad två öron klarar"	Joakim Berg	Kent	1995	
"Våga vara rädd"	Joakim Berg	Tillbaka till samtiden	2007	
"Välgärningar & illdåd"	Joakim Berg	B-side of "Max 500"	2005	
"Vals för Satan (din vän pessimisten)"	Joakim Berg; Martin Sköld	Röd	2009	
"Var är vi nu?"	Joakim Berg	Tigerdrottningen	2014	
"Varje gång du möter min blick"	Joakim Berg	En plats i solen	2010	
"Velvet"	Joakim Berg	Isola	1998	
"Verkligen"	Kent	B-side of "Gravitation"	1996	
"Vi är för alltid"	Joakim Berg	Då som nu för alltid	2016	
"Vi är inte längre där"	Joakim Berg	Då som nu för alltid	2016	
"Vi kan väl vänta tills imorgon"	Joakim Berg	Verkligen	1996	
"Vi mot världen"	Joakim Berg	The hjärta & smärta EP	2005	
"Vid din sida"	Joakim Berg; Martin Sköld	Tillbaka till samtiden	2007	
"VinterNoll2"	Joakim Berg	FF / VinterNoll2	2002	
"Vintervila"	Joakim Berg	B-side of "Dom andra"	2002	
"Visslaren"	Joakim Berg	Hagnesta Hill	1999	
"Vy från ett luftslott"	Joakim Berg; Martin Sköld	Tillbaka till samtiden	2007	

== Unreleased songs ==
List of unreleased songs, showing title and details
Title	Details	Ref.
"Håll ditt huvud högt"	The song was performed during the 2008 summer tour. A live version of it was released on the compilation album Box 1991–2008.	
"Håll i mig"	The song was written in the early 1990s and can be found on the compilation album Box 1991–2008 as a demo.	
"Vinter17"	The song was performed three times during the 2016 farewell tour, on 15, 16 and 17 December.	
"Ögon"	The song was written in the early 1990s and can be found on the compilation album Box 1991–2008 as a demo.	

== See also ==
- Kent discography
