= List of awards and nominations received by Kent =

Kent awards and nominations
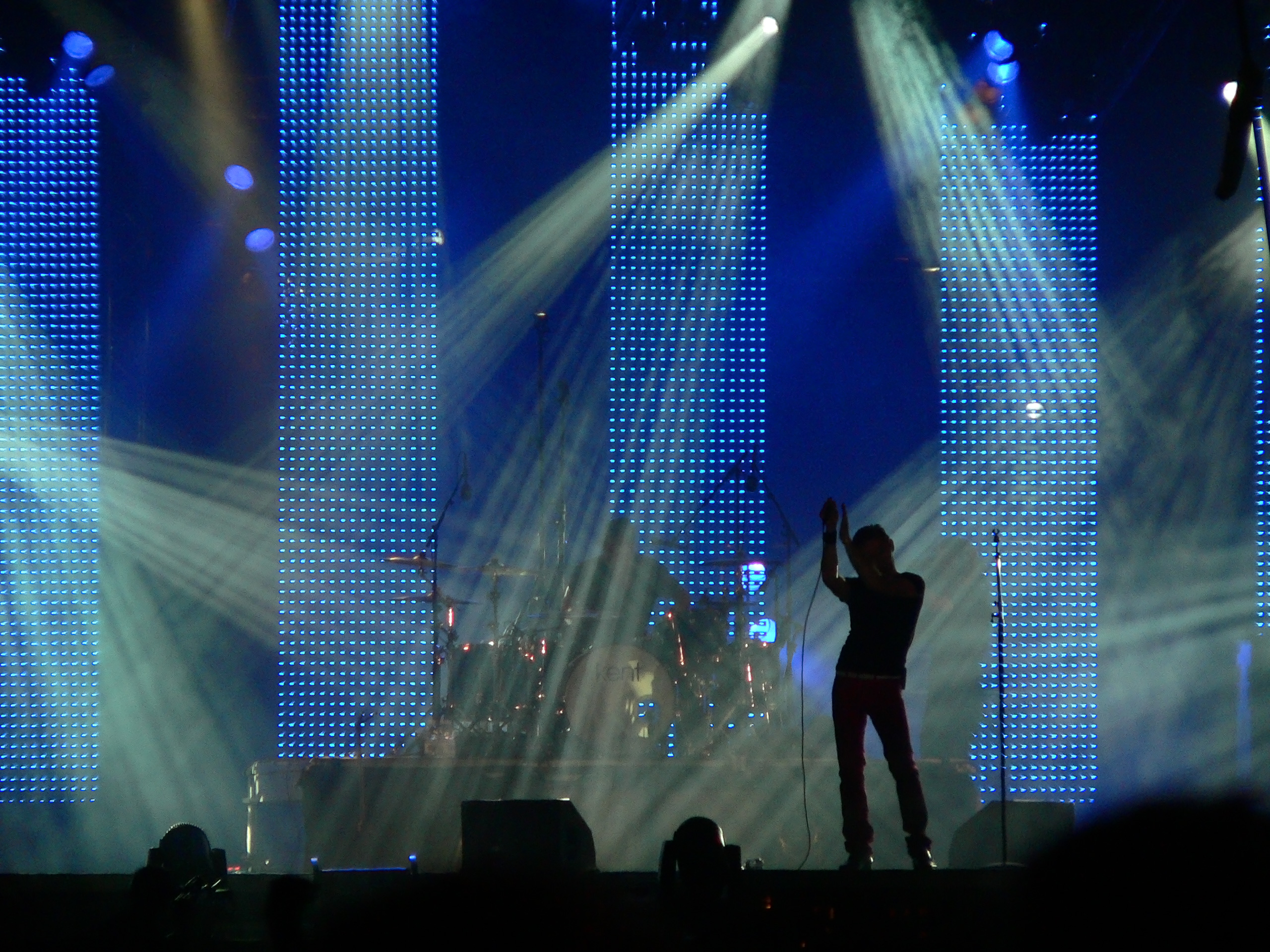
- Kent performing at the Roskilde Festival in 2005
Awards and nominations
	Wins	Nominations
GAFFA-Priset	13	13
Grammis	22	52
Guldgadden	1	1
MTV Europe Music Award	1	3
Nordic Music Awards	1	2
P3 Guld	7	11
Rockbjörn	12	25
- Totals
Wins	58
Nominations	107

This is a list of awards and nominations received by Swedish alternative rock band Kent.

== Awards and nominations ==
Year	Organization	Nominated work	Award	Result
1996	Grammis	Kent	Newcomer of the Year	Nominated
1996	Grammis	Kent	Best Pop/Rock Group	Won
1996	Grammis	Kent	Best Album	Nominated
1997	Grammis	Kent	Artist of the Year	Nominated
1997	Grammis	Kent	Best Pop/Rock Group	Nominated
1997	Grammis	Verkligen	Best Album	Nominated
1997	Grammis	"Gravitation"	Best Music Video	Won
1997	Grammis	Joakim Berg	Lyricist of the Year	Nominated
1997	Rockbjörn	Verkligen	Best Album	Won
1998	Grammis	Kent	Artist of the Year	Nominated
1998	Grammis	Kent	Best Pop/Rock Group	Won
1998	Grammis	Isola	Best Album	Won
1998	Grammis	Joakim Berg	Lyricist of the Year	Nominated
1998	Rockbjörn	Kent	Best Swedish Group	Won
1998	Rockbjörn	Isola	Best Swedish Album	Won
1998	Guldgadden	Kent	Best Live Band	Won
2000	Grammis	Kent	Best Pop/Rock Group	Won
2000	Grammis	Hagnesta Hill	Best Album	Nominated
2000	Grammis	"Musik non stop"	Best Song	Nominated
2000	Grammis	Joakim Berg	Songwriter of the Year	Nominated
2000	Rockbjörn	Kent	Best Swedish Group	Won
2000	Rockbjörn	"Musik non stop"	Best Swedish Song	Won
2001	Rockbjörn	Kent	Best Swedish Group	Nominated
2002	MTV Europe Music Award	Kent	Best Nordic Act	Won
2003	Grammis	Kent	Artist of the Year	Won
2003	Grammis	Kent	Best Group	Won
2003	Grammis	Vapen & ammunition	Best Album	Won
2003	Grammis	"Dom andra"	Best Song	Won
2003	Grammis	Joakim Berg	Songwriter of the Year	Won
2003	Grammis	Joakim Berg	Lyricist of the Year	Won
2003	Grammis	Kent, Martin von Schmalensee, Zed	Best Producer	Won
2003	Rockbjörn	Kent	Best Swedish Group	Won
2003	Rockbjörn	Vapen & ammunition	Best Swedish Album	Won
2003	P3 Guld	Kent	Best Group	Won
2003	P3 Guld	"Dom andra"	Best Song	Won
2004	Rockbjörn	Kent	Best Swedish Group	Won
2005	Nordic Music Awards	Kent	Best Swedish Artist	Nominated
2005	Nordic Music Awards	Kent	Best Nordic Artist	Won
2005	MTV Europe Music Award	Kent	Best Swedish Act	Nominated
2006	Grammis	Kent	Artist of the Year	Nominated
2006	Grammis	Kent	Best Rock Group	Won
2006	Grammis	Du & jag döden	Best Album	Nominated
2006	Grammis	The hjärta & smärta EP	Best Song	Nominated
2006	Grammis	Joakim Berg	Songwriter of the Year	Nominated
2006	Grammis	Joakim Berg	Lyricist of the Year	Nominated
2006	Grammis	"Dom som försvann"	Best Music Video	Won
2006	Rockbjörn	Kent	Best Swedish Group	Nominated
2006	Rockbjörn	Du & jag döden	Best Swedish Album	Won
2006	P3 Guld	Kent	Best Group	Won
2008	Grammis	Kent	Best Group	Won
2008	Grammis	Tillbaka till samtiden	Best Album	Won
2008	Grammis	Joakim Berg, Martin Sköld	Songwriter of the Year	Nominated
2008	Grammis	Joakim Berg	Lyricist of the Year	Nominated
2008	Grammis	Kent, Joshua	Best Producer	Nominated
2008	Rockbjörn	Kent	Best Swedish Group	Nominated
2008	Rockbjörn	Kent	Best Live Act	Nominated
2008	Rockbjörn	Tillbaka till samtiden	Best Swedish Album	Won
2008	Rockbjörn	"Ingenting"	Best Song	Nominated
2008	P3 Guld	Kent	Best Group	Won
2009	Grammis	Kent	Best Group	Nominated
2009	Rockbjörn	Kent	Best Swedish Group	Nominated
2009	Rockbjörn	Kent	Best Live Act	Nominated
2009	Rockbjörn	Box 1991–2008	Best Swedish Album	Nominated
2009	Rockbjörn	"Håll ditt huvud högt"	Best Song	Nominated
2009	P3 Guld	Kent	Golden Mic	Nominated
2010	Grammis	Kent	Artist of the Year	Nominated
2010	Grammis	Röd	Best Rock	Won
2010	Grammis	Röd	Best Album	Nominated
2010	Grammis	Joakim Berg	Lyricist of the Year	Nominated
2010	Grammis	Kent, Joshua	Best Producer	Won
2010	Rockbjörn	Kent	Best Concert	Nominated
2010	Rockbjörn	Kent	Best Live Band	Won
2010	P3 Guld	Kent	Best Group	Won
2010	MTV Europe Music Award	Kent	Best Swedish Act	Nominated
2011	Grammis	Kent	Best Group	Nominated
2011	P3 Guld	Kent	Best Group	Nominated
2011	GAFFA-Priset	Kent	Best Swedish Group	Won
2011	GAFFA-Priset	En plats i solen	Best Swedish Album	Won
2011	GAFFA-Priset	"Skisser för sommaren"	Best Swedish Song	Won
2013	Grammis	Jag är inte rädd för mörkret	Best Rock	Nominated
2013	Grammis	Joakim Berg	Lyricist of the Year	Nominated
2013	Rockbjörn	Kent	Best Live Band	Nominated
2013	P3 Guld	Kent	Best Group	Won
2013	GAFFA-Priset	Kent	Best Swedish Group	Won
2015	Grammis	Tigerdrottningen	Best Rock	Won
2015	Grammis	Tigerdrottningen	Best Album	Nominated
2015	Grammis	Joakim Berg	Songwriter of the Year	Nominated
2015	Grammis	Joakim Berg	Lyricist of the Year	Won
2015	Rockbjörn	Kent	Best Live Band	Nominated
2015	P3 Guld	Kent	Best Group	Nominated
2015	GAFFA-Priset	Kent	Best Group	Won
2015	GAFFA-Priset	Tigerdrottningen	Best Album	Won
2015	GAFFA-Priset	Tigerdrottningen	Best Pop	Won
2015	GAFFA-Priset	"La Belle Epoque"	Best Song	Won
2016	Hall of Fame	Kent	Swedish Music Hall of Fame	Won
2017	Grammis	Kent	Artist of the Year	Nominated
2017	Grammis	Då som nu för alltid	Best Rock	Won
2017	Grammis	Då som nu för alltid	Best Album	Won
2017	Grammis	Joakim Berg	Lyricist of the Year	Nominated
2017	Rockbjörn	Kent	Best Concert	Nominated
2017	Rockbjörn	Kent	Best Live Band	Won
2017	P3 Guld	Kent	Best Group	Won
2017	P3 Guld	Kent	Golden Mic	Nominated
2017	GAFFA-Priset	Kent	Best Swedish Group	Won
2017	GAFFA-Priset	Då som nu för alltid	Best Swedish Album	Won
2017	GAFFA-Priset	Då som nu för alltid	Best Swedish Pop	Won
2017	GAFFA-Priset	Kent	Best Live Act	Won
2026	GAFFA-Priset	Kent	Best Live Act	Won
