= Best Of (Kent album) =

2016 Kent compilation album

Compilation album by Kent
- Released: 16 September 2016
- Recorded: 1995–2016
- Genre: Alternative rock
- Length: 106:50
- Label: RCA, Sony Music
- Producer: Kent; Nille Perned; Zed; Martin von Schmalensee; Stefan Boman; Joshua; Daniel Alexander

Kent chronology
Då som nu för alltid (2016)	Best Of (2016)

Professional ratings
Review scores
Source	Rating
Aftonbladet	2/5 stars
Expressen	3/5 stars

Best Of is a greatest hits album by Swedish alternative rock band Kent. The album was released on 16 September 2016 by RCA Records and Sony Music. It features 20 previously released tracks and four new studio recordings.

== Critical reception ==
Anders Nunstedt of Expressen wrote: "But it's the final four, previously unreleased, songs that are the compilation's highlight. They sound like a great EP."

Markus Larsson of Aftonbladet wrote: "With a few exceptions, these are singles that together form a quick introduction to Kent. That's the tip of the iceberg. Several of them cannot of course be replaced, but considering how much good music the group has released since 1995, Best of gives a misleading and banal image of Sweden's biggest band. Which really says more about Kent's song treasure than anything else."

== Track listing ==
All lyrics are written by Joakim Berg.

Disc 1
No.	Title	Writer(s)	Original album	Length
1.	"Blåjeans"	Joakim Berg	Kent	2:58
2.	"När det blåser på månen"	Martin Sköld	Kent	4:19
3.	"Kräm (så nära får ingen gå)"	Berg, Sköld	Verkligen	2:41
4.	"Gravitation"	Berg	Verkligen	3:42
5.	"Om du var här"	Berg	Isola	4:00
6.	"747"	Berg	Isola	7:47
7.	"Musik non stop"	Berg	Hagnesta Hill	4:34
8.	"Kevlarsjäl"	Berg	Hagnesta Hill	4:26
9.	"Utan dina andetag"	Berg	B-sidor 95–00	4:24
10.	"Dom andra"	Berg	Vapen & ammunition	3:45
11.	"Sverige"	Berg	Vapen & ammunition	2:58
12.	"Kärleken väntar"	Berg	Vapen & ammunition	3:58

Disc 2
No.	Title	Writer(s)	Original album	Length
1.	"Mannen i den vita hatten (16 år senare)"	Berg	Du & jag döden	6:36
2.	"Ingenting"	Berg	Tillbaka till samtiden	4:17
3.	"Töntarna"	Berg, Sköld	Röd	4:38
4.	"Skisser för sommaren"	Berg	En plats i solen	4:13
5.	"999"	Kent	Jag är inte rädd för mörkret	6:51
6.	"La Belle Epoque"	Berg	Tigerdrottningen	3:55
7.	"Egoist"	Berg		4:03
8.	"Vi är inte längre där"	Berg	Då som nu för alltid	5:19
9.	"Terapi" (Therapy)	Berg	Best Of	4:45
10.	"Nostromo"	Berg	Best Of	4:01
11.	"Om du visste vad du ville" (If You Knew What You Wanted)	Berg	Best Of	4:45
12.	"Silver"	Berg	Best Of	3:56

== Charts ==
=== Weekly charts ===
Chart (2016)	Peak position
Finnish Albums (Suomen virallinen lista)	9
Norwegian Albums (VG-lista)	16
Swedish Albums (Sverigetopplistan)	1

=== Year-end charts ===
Chart (2016)	Position
Swedish Albums (Sverigetopplistan)	25
Chart (2017)	Position
Swedish Albums (Sverigetopplistan)	55
