= Box 1991–2008 =

2008 Compilation album by Kent

Compilation album by Kent
- Released: 29 October 2008
- Recorded: 1991–2008
- Genre: Alternative rock
- Length: 9:50:12
- Label: BMG
- Producer: Kent, Zed, Martin "Nåid" Landquist, Martin von Schmalensee, Nille Perned, Stefan Boman, Joshua, Heikki Kiviaho, Magnus Frykberg

Kent chronology
Tillbaka till samtiden (2007)	Box 1991–2008 (2008)	Röd (2009)

Box 1991–2008 is a summary of Swedish alternative rock band Kent's career. The Box contains almost everything the group has ever recorded between 1991 and 2008. It contains every B-side, many demo recordings and every studio album. It also contains the first official live recording the group has ever made of a concert, a live recording of a new, previously unreleased song called "Håll ditt huvud högt" (Hold your head high) made during a concert in the band's hometown of Eskilstuna in July 2008.

== Content ==
The Box contains every studio album the band has ever recorded, except for their English releases of Isola and Hagnesta Hill and their respective singles, and also every B-side released after 2000 (all pre-2000 B-sides were released on the compilation CD B-sidor 95–00, which is also included in the box). It also include some demo recordings and four songs that were recorded pre-Kent. Two songs that were released when the band went under the name of Havsänglar (Sea Angels) and two recorded when the band was called Jones & Giftet (Jones & the Poison). All albums have new covers and the box contains inner bags drawn by lead singer Jocke Berg. The box also contains a 96-page-long interview with the band made by Swedish journalist, columnist and writer Jan Gradvall. The box also contains tour history, song lyrics and private pictures.

=== List of content ===
- All 8 albums, all with new covers
- 26 different bonus tracks
- 15 previously unreleased tracks
- A total of 133 tracks
- The live version of "Håll ditt huvud högt" (Hold your head high) recorded in Eskilstuna the summer of 2008
- 96-page book containing an interview by Jan Gradvall
- Private pictures
- Tour history
- Song lyrics
- Inner bags drawn by Joakim Berg

== Track listing ==
=== Kent ===
1. Blåjeans Blue jeans 2:57
2. Som vatten Like water 2:53
3. Ingenting någonsin Nothing Ever 3:57
4. När det blåser på månen When it is windy on the Moon 4:19
5. Jag vill inte vara rädd I don't want to be afraid 3:30
6. Vad två öron klarar What two ears can take 3:42
7. Den osynlige mannen The Invisible Man 2:41
8. Pojken med hålet i handen The Boy with the Hole in his hand 2:08
9. Ingen kommer att tro dig No one will believe you 3:31
10. Stenbrott Quarry 4:18
11. Frank 4:48

Bonus tracks:

1. Döda dagar Dead Days 3:47
2. Håll i mig Hold me (Jones och giftet) 4:36
3. Ögon Eyes (Jones och giftet) 5:07
4. Klocka Clock (Havsänglar) 4:40
5. Cirkel Circle (Havsänglar) 3:59

=== Verkligen ===
1. Avtryck Print 3:11
2. Kräm (så nära får ingen gå) Cream (No one can come that close) 2:42
3. Gravitation Gravity 3:44
4. Istället för ljud Instead of sounds 4:22
5. 10 Minuter (För mig själv) 10 Minutes (To myself) 3:10
6. En timme en minut An hour a minute 8:08
7. Indianer Indians 3:47
8. Halka Slipperiness 3:03
9. Thinner Thinner 3:59
10. Vi kan väl vänta tills imorgon Can't we wait until tomorrow 6:55

Bonus tracks:

1. Saker man ser (demo) Things you see (demo) 3:16
2. Alpha (demo) Alpha (demo) 3:30
3. Din skugga (demo) Your shadow (demo) 4:10

=== Isola ===
1. Livräddaren Life saver 4:36
2. Om du var här If you were here 3:59
3. Saker man ser Things you see 3:54
4. Oprofessionell Unprofessional 4:43
5. OWC 3:08
6. Celsius Celsius 4:15
7. Bianca Bianca 4:55
8. Innan allting tar slut Before everything ends 3:40
9. Elvis Elvis 4:33
10. Glider Glider 4:04
11. 747 7:47

Bonus tracks:

1. OWC (live, 2 Meter Sessions, The Netherlands) 3:00
2. Celsius (live, 2 Meter Sessions, The Netherlands) 4:04

=== Hagnesta Hill ===
1. Kungen är död The King is Dead 4:17
2. Revolt III 3:10
3. Musik non stop Music Non Stop 4:34
4. Kevlarsjäl Kevlar Soul 4:26
5. Ett tidsfördriv att dö för A timekill to die for 4:36
6. Stoppa mig juni (Lilla ego) Stop me June (Little Ego) 06:22
7. En himmelsk drog A Heavenly Drug 4:04
8. Stanna hos mig Stay with me 3:57
9. Cowboys Cowboys 5:49
10. Beskyddaren The protector 4:46
11. Berg&Dalvana Rollercoaster 4:47
12. Insekter Insects 4:08
13. Visslaren The whistler 7:47

Bonus track:

1. Inhale/Exhale (demo) 4:04

=== B-sidor 95-00/CD1 ===
1. Chans Chance 5:21
2. Spökstad Ghost town 4:41
3. Längtan skala 3:1 Longing scale 3:1 6:51
4. Om gyllene år About golden years 2:39
5. Noll Zero 4:28
6. Önskar att någon... (I) Wish that someone... 3:56
7. Bas riff Bass riff 3:39
8. Din skugga Your shadow 4:04
9. Elever Students 4:45
10. Längesen vi sågs Long time no see 4:29
11. December December 3:46
12. Utan dina andetag Without your Breath 4:23
13. På nära håll At close quarters 3:19

=== B-sidor 95-00/CD2 ===
1. Livrädd med stil Terrified with style 3:03
2. Verkligen Really 5:30
3. Gummiband Rubber band 4:46
4. Att presentera ett svin To introduce a swine 4:26
5. En helt ny karriär A Whole New Career 4:08
6. Rödljus Red Lights 3:40
7. Pojken med hålet i handen (Hotbilds version) The boy with the hole in his hand 4:11
8. Kallt kaffe Cold coffee 3:26
9. Den osynlige mannen (Kazoo version) The Invisible Man 2:38
10. Slutsats Conclusion 2:48
11. Rödljus II Red Lights II 4:34
12. En helt ny karriär II A Whole New Career II 5:27

=== Vapen & ammunition ===
1. Sundance Kid 5:09
2. Pärlor Pearls 3:55
3. Dom andra The Others 3:46
4. Duett Duet 4:42
5. Hur jag fick dig att älska mig How I made you love me 5:21
6. Kärleken väntar Love awaits 3:59
7. Socker Sugar 5:35
8. FF 4:13
9. Elite 6:05
10. Sverige Sweden 2:58

Bonus tracks:

1. Vintervila Winter rest 4:14
2. Lämnar Leaving 4:53
3. VinterNoll2 WinterZero2 4:25
4. Socker (demo) Sugar (demo) 4:36
5. Love Undone (demo) 3:58

=== Du & jag döden ===
1. 400 slag 400 Blows 4:57
2. Du är ånga You are Steam 3:51
3. Den döda vinkeln The Dead Angle 4:19
4. Du var min armé You were my army 3:30
5. Palace & Main 4:05
6. Järnspöken Iron Ghosts 3:48
7. Klåparen Bungler 5:25
8. Max 500 3:35
9. Romeo återvänder ensam Romeo Returns Alone 4:03
10. Rosor & Palmblad Roses & Palm leaves 4:05
11. Mannen i den vita hatten (16 år senare) The Man in the White Hat (16 Years Later) 6:37

Bonus tracks:

1. M 4:23
2. Välgärningar och illdåd Benefactories and Atrocities 3:40
3. Nihilisten The Nihilist 4:14
4. Alla mot alla All against All 4:00

=== The hjärta & smärta EP ===
1. Vi mot världen Us against the World 4:10
2. Dom som försvann Those who disappeared 4:54
3. Ansgar & Evelyne 4:16
4. Flen/Paris 3:44
5. Månadens erbjudande Offer of the Month 4:10

Bonus track:

1. Nålens öga Eye of the Needle 6:14

=== Tillbaka till samtiden ===
1. Elefanter Elephants 5:21
2. Berlin 4:36
3. Ingenting Nothing 4:17
4. Vid din sida By your side 4:55
5. Columbus 4:26
6. Sömnen The Sleep 4:08
7. Vy från ett luftslott View from an Air castle 4:23
8. Våga vara rädd Dare to be afraid 3:59
9. LSD, någon? LSD, Anyone? 4:20
10. Generation Ex Generation Ex 4:30
11. Ensammast i Sverige Loneliest in Sweden 8:20

Bonus tracks:

1. Min värld My World 4:06
2. Tick Tack 4:01 Tick Tock
3. Det kanske kommer en förändring There might come a change 5:24
4. Ingenting (demo) Nothing (Demo) 3:47
5. Håll ditt huvud högt Hold your head high (Live, Eskilstuna, summer '08) 5:11

== Signings ==
One week after the box had been released, Kent held two signings in Sweden, one in Stockholm at Åhléns, and another one in Gothenburg at Bengans Record Store. The two signings were held at the same day, only a few hours apart.

== Personnel ==
=== Musicians ===
- Joakim Berg – vocals, guitar
- Martin Sköld – bass guitar, keyboards
- Sami Sirviö – lead guitar, keyboards
- Markus Mustonen – drums, grand piano, keyboards, backing vocals
- Harri Mänty – rhythm guitar, programming, percussion (On Verkligen, Isola, Hagnesta Hill, B-Sidor 95-00, Vapen & Ammunition, Du & Jag Döden and The Hjärta & Smärta EP)
- Martin Roos – rhythm guitar (on Kent and B-Sidor 95-00)
- Thomas Bergqvist – keyboards on (on "Håll i mig" and "Ögon")
- Max Brandt – Live rhythm guitar (on "Håll ditt huvud högt")
- Andreas Bovin – Live keyboards (on "Håll ditt huvud högt")
- Camela Leierth – Backing vocals (on "Generation Ex" and "Vy från ett Luftslott")
- Lisa Miskovsky – Backing vocals on ("Välgärningar & Illdåd")
- Martin Von Schmalensee – slide guitar (on "Sundance Kid"), acoustic guitar (on "Elite")
- Titiyo – vocals (on "Duett")
- Nancy Danino – vocals (on "FF")
- Jojje Wadenius – acoustic guitar (on "Sverige")
- Henrik Rongedal, Ingela Olson, Jessica Pilnäs, Niklas Gabrielsson – backing vocals (on "Elite")
- Thobias Gabrielsson – backing vocal arrangement (on "Elite")
- Bill Öhrström – harmonica (on "Kevlarsjäl")
- Jörgen Wall – percussion (on "Stanna hos mig")
- Håkan Nyqvist – French horn (on Hagnesta Hill)
- Peter Asplund – flugelhorn, trumpet (on Hagnesta Hill)
- Sven Berggren – trombone (on Hagnesta Hill)
- Tony Bauer – viola (on Hagnesta Hill)
- Jannika Gustafsson – violin (on Hagnesta Hill)
- Saara Nisonen-Öman – violin (on Hagnesta Hill)
- Kati Raitinen – cello (on Hagnesta Hill)
- Joakim Midler – string and brass arrangement, conduction (on Verkligen, Isola and Hagnesta Hill)
- Klara Hellgren – first violin (on Isola)
- David Björkman – second violin (on Isola)
- Ulrika Gardelin – viola (on Isola)
- Henrik Söderquist – cello (on Isola)
- Nille Perned – additional guitar and keyboards. String and brass arrangement (On Verkligen) Additional guitars (On Kent)
- Zmago Smon – bass guitar (on "Halka")
- Pöpen – "dubkrash" (On Verkligen) and 10-0 countdown (on "När det blåser på månen")
- David Bergström – first violin (On Verkligen)
- Karin Eriksson – second violin (On Verkligen)
- Henrik Edström – viola (On Verkligen)
- Lars-Erik Persson – cello (On Verkligen)
- Niclas Rydh – bass trombone (On Verkligen)
- Lars-Göran Carlsson – trombone (On Verkligen)
- Mikael Appelgren – trombone (On Verkligen)
- Nille Perned's dad – Additional guitars (On Kent)

=== Producers ===
- Kent (On all songs)
- Nille Perned (On Kent, Verkligen, B-Sidor 95-00 and The Hjärta & Smärta EP)
- Zed (On Isola, Hagnesta Hill, B-Sidor 95-00 and Vapen & Ammunition)
- Martin von Schmalensee (On B-Sidor 95-00 and Vapen & Ammunition)
- Martin "Nåid" Landquist (On B-Sidor 95-00)
- Stefan Boman (On The Hjärta & Smärta EP and Du & Jag Döden)
- Joshua (On Tillbaka till Samtiden)
- Heikki Kiviaho (On B-Sidor 95-00)
- Magnus Frykberg (On B-Sidor 95-00)

=== Other ===
- Jan Gradvall – Interviewer

== Charts ==
=== Weekly charts ===
Chart (2008–2009)	Peak position
Finnish Albums (Suomen virallinen lista)	18
Norwegian Albums (VG-lista)	38
Swedish Albums (Sverigetopplistan)	1

=== Year-end charts ===
Chart (2008)	Position
Swedish Albums (Sverigetopplistan)	22
Chart (2009)	Position
Swedish Albums (Sverigetopplistan)	52

== Certifications ==
Region	Certification	Certified units/sales
Sweden (GLF)	Gold	20,000^{^}
^{^} Shipments figures based on certification alone.
