= B-sidor 95–00 =

2000 compilation album by Kent

Compilation album by Kent
- Released: 29 November 2000
- Recorded: 1995–2000
- Genre: Alternative rock
- Length: 118:59
- Label: BMG
- Producer: Kent, Zed, Martin "Nåid" Landquist, Martin von Schmalensee, Nille Perned, Heikki Kiviaho, Magnus Frykberg

Kent chronology
Hagnesta Hill (1999)	B-sidor 95–00 (2000)	Vapen & ammunition (2002)

Singles from B-sidor 95–00
- 1. "Chans" Released: 22 November 2000

B-Sidor 95–00 is a B-side collection by Swedish alternative rock band Kent. It was released in November 2000 and features two new songs, "Chans" and "Spökstad". As the title implies, it compiles B-sides that had appeared on the group's CD singles between the years 1995 and 2000.

"Rödljus II" and "En helt ny karriär II" are new recordings of the original ones. Hidden track "Papin jahti" is an improvisation where the band's drummer Markus sings in Finnish. "Spökstad" is one of the most rare Kent singles as it was sent out and then retracted. Some copies found their way to the record stores before it was retracted. It exists in a very limited amount of copies.

== Track listing ==
Disc one
No.	Title	Music	Featured on	Length
1.	"Chans" (Chance)	Joakim Berg	"B-sidor 95–00"	5:21
2.	"Spökstad" (Ghost Town)	Berg	"B-sidor 95–00"	4:41
3.	"Längtan skala 3:1" (Longing Scale 3:1)	Berg	"Kevlarsjäl"	6:51
4.	"Om gyllene år" (About Golden Years)	Berg	"En himmelsk drog"	2:39
5.	"Noll" (Zero)	Berg	"En himmelsk drog"	4:28
6.	"Önskar att någon..." (Wish That Someone...)	Berg	"Musik non stop"	3:56
7.	"Bas riff" (Bass Riff)	Berg	"Musik non stop"	3:39
8.	"Din skugga" (Your Shadow)	Berg	"747"	4:04
9.	"Elever" (Students)	Berg	"747"	4:45
10.	"Längesen vi sågs" (Long Time No See)	Berg	"Saker man ser"	4:29
11.	"December"	Berg	"Saker man ser"	3:46
12.	"Utan dina andetag" (Without Your Breath)	Berg	"Om du var här"	4:23
13.	"På nära håll" (Close at Hand)	Berg	"Om du var här"	3:19

Disc two
No.	Title	Music	Featured on	Length
1.	"Livrädd med stil" (Terrified with Style)	Berg	"Gravitation"	3:03
2.	"Verkligen" (Really)	Kent	"Gravitation"	5:30
3.	"Gummiband" (Rubber Band)	Berg	"Halka"	4:46
4.	"Att presentera ett svin" (To Present a Pig)	Berg	"Halka"	4:27
5.	"En helt ny karriär" (A Whole New Career)	Berg	"Kräm (så nära får ingen gå)"	4:08
6.	"Rödljus" (Red Lights)	Berg	"Kräm (så nära får ingen gå)"	3:40
7.	"Pojken med hålet i handen (hotbilds version)" (The Boy with the Hole in the Hand)	Martin Sköld	"Jag vill inte vara rädd"	4:11
8.	"Kallt kaffe" (Cold Coffee)	Berg	"Frank"	3:26
9.	"Den osynlige mannen (kazoo version)" (The Invisible Man)	Berg	"Som vatten"	2:38
10.	"Slutsats" (Conclusion)	Berg	"När det blåser på månen"	2:48
11.	"Rödljus II" (Red Lights II)	Berg	"B-sidor 95–00"	4:34
12.	"En helt ny karriär II" (A Whole New Career II)	Berg	"B-sidor 95–00"	5:27

== Personnel ==
Kent

- Joakim Berg – music, lyrics, vocals, guitar
- Martin Sköld – bass, keyboards
- Sami Sirviö – guitar, keyboards
- Markus Mustonen – drums, backing vocals, keyboards, piano
- Harri Mänty – rhythm guitar, percussion
- Martin Roos – rhythm guitar

Additional musicians

- Martin Landquist – synthesizer on track 1, 2
- Kristina Jansson – vocals on track 2
- Peter Svensson – guitar on track 4
- Chris Gordon – acoustic guitar on track 13

Artwork

- Jonas Linell – photography
- Helen Sköld – design
- Ida Höglund – design

== Charts ==
=== Weekly charts ===
Weekly chart performance for B-sidor 95–00
Chart (2000–2001)	Peak position
Finnish Albums (Suomen virallinen lista)	18
Norwegian Albums (VG-lista)	31
Swedish Albums (Sverigetopplistan)	2

=== Year-end charts ===
Year-end chart performance for B-sidor 95–00
Chart (2000)	Position
Swedish Albums (Sverigetopplistan)	58
