= P3 Gold =

P3 Gold may refer to:

- P3 Gold Awards, awarded by SR P3 to recognise Swedish music
- P3 Gull, awarded by NRK P3 to recognise Norwegian music
- P3 Guld, awarded by DR P3 to recognise Danish music
