= Adam Berg (director) =

Swedish director and writer

Adam Berg (born 6 December 1972) is a Swedish director and writer.

== Career ==
Berg has created and directed a number of television and cinema commercials. In 2009, Carousel, a 139-second advertisement directed by Berg for Philips, won the Film Grand Prix at the Cannes Lions International Advertising Festival, the most prestigious award in the advertising industry. Berg has also directed commercials for Apple, Uber, MichelobULTRA, Gillette, and FiFA, and won awards at the British Arrows, the AICP Awards, and the Design and Art Direction Awards. He is represented by commercial production company Smuggler.

His short film IN (2011) won the Best Short Film Award at the 2011 Gothenburg Film Festival.

Berg served as an executive producer on the Amazon Prime Video original series Tales from the Loop, which was adapted from the Swedish art book of the same name by Simon Stålenhag.

His feature film debut, Black Crab, starring Noomi Rapace, was released on Netflix on 18 March 2022.

== Videography ==
- A-ha – "Summer Moved On"
- Afro Celt Sound System – "When You're Falling"
- Amanda Ghost – "Idol"
- Death in Vegas – "Rocco"
- dEUS – "Sister Dew"
- E-Type – "Free Like a Flying Demon"
- Esbjörn Svensson Trio – "From Gagarin's Point of View"
- Gay Dad – "Oh Jim"
- Graham Coxon – "I Wish"
- Grass Show – "1962"
- Groove Armada – "My Friend"
- Haven – "Tell Me"
- Idlewild – "A Film for the Future"
- Idlewild – "Everyone Says You're So Fragile"
- Idlewild – "I'm a Message"
- JJ72 – "Formulae"
- Junkie XL – "Catch Up to My Step"
- Kent – "Kräm (så nära får ingen gå)"
- Kent – "Gravitation"
- Kent – "Om du var här"
- Kent – "Saker man ser"
- Kent – "747"
- Kent – "Music Non Stop""
- Kent – "Chans"
- Kent – "Dom andra"
- Kent – "FF"
- Kent – "VinterNoll2"
- Kent – "Palace & Main"
- Kent – "Dom som försvann"
- Kent – "Ingenting"
- Kent – "Då Som Nu För Alltid" (announcement video)
- Lisa Miskovsky – "Lady Stardust"
- Lune – "Leave the World Behind"
- Mandalay – "Beautiful"
- Nåid – "Turn On (City Lights)"
- Paus – "Leia"
- Reef – "All I Want"
- Swingfly – "Street Life"
- The Cardigans – "Erase/Rewind"
- The Motorhomes – "Into the Night"
- Warm Jets – "Hurricane"
- Yvonne – "Modern Love"
