= Adam Berg =

Adam Berg may refer to:

- Adam Berg (director) (born 1972), Swedish music video director
- Adam Berg (publisher) (1540–1610), German publisher
