= If You Were Here =

If You Were Here may refer to:

- "If You Were Here" (Kent song), a song by Kent
- "If You Were Here", a song by Poe from Haunted
- "If You Were Here", a song by the band Thompson Twins from the third studio album, Quick Step & Side Kick (1983)
- "If You Were Here Tonight", a song by Alexander O'Neal
