= Kent (band) =

Swedish alternative rock band

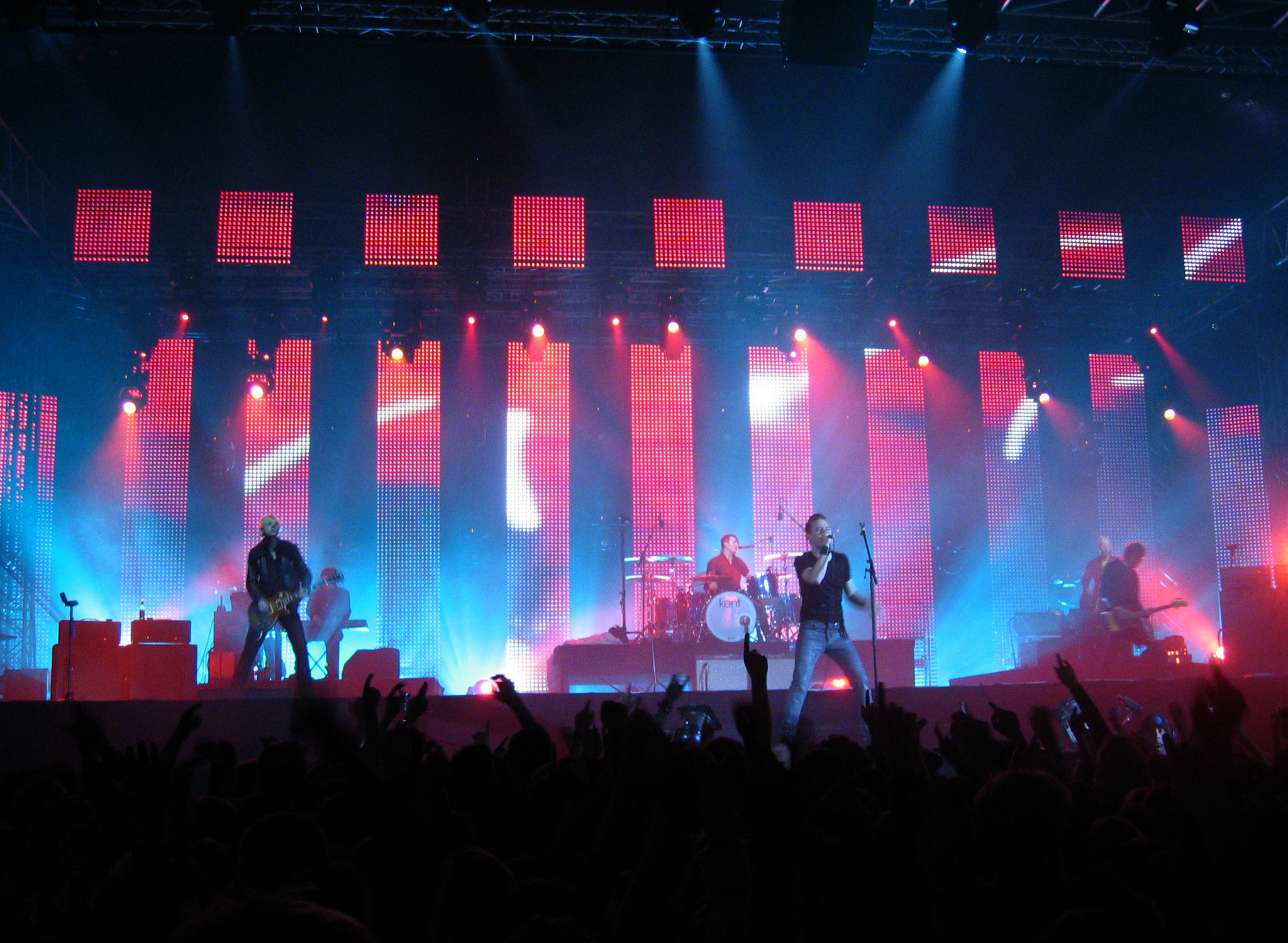
- Kent performing in Norrköping in May 2005

Background information
- Origin: Eskilstuna, Sweden
- Genres: Alternative rock; pop rock; synthpop
- Works: Discography; songs
- Years active: 1990–2016; 2025
- Labels: BMG; RCA; Sony; Universal
- Awards: Full list
- Past members: Joakim Berg; Martin Sköld; Sami Sirviö; Markus Mustonen; Harri Mänty; Martin Roos; Thomas Bergquist
- Website: kent.nu
- Logo
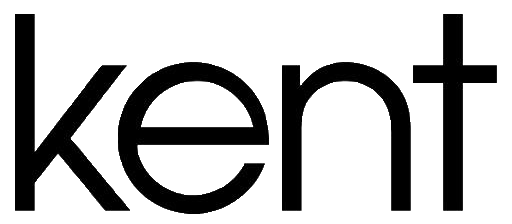

Kent was a Swedish alternative rock band formed in Eskilstuna in 1990. With members Joakim Berg, Martin Sköld, Sami Sirviö and Markus Mustonen, the band had numerous radio hits throughout Sweden and Scandinavia and consecutive number-one studio albums on the Sweden top list (Sverigetopplistan) beginning with the release of Verkligen (1996) and led by the single "Kräm (så nära får ingen gå)". With origins rooted in distorted rock, they found mainstream success through their alternative rock albums of the mid-1990s, 2000s and 2010s, the latter decades during which they adopted elements of synthpop.

With eleven number-one albums, five number-one singles, 22 Swedish Grammy Awards, and over three million record sales, Kent is considered the most popular rock/pop group within Sweden and throughout Scandinavia. Vapen & ammunition (2002) topped the Swedish charts for eight weeks. The band was inducted into the Swedish Music Hall of Fame in 2016.

As Kent's songs are primarily performed in Swedish, they are unfamiliar to most English-speaking audiences. Kent briefly attempted an international career with English versions of the albums Isola (1997) and Hagnesta Hill (1999) and an accompanying American tour for the former, but stopped after finding less success than they had in Scandinavia.

On 14 March 2016, the band announced that they would release their final album, titled Då som nu för alltid, after 26 years of performing. The album was released on 20 May 2016. The band's announcement noted that the dissolution of the band is voluntary and is despite their continued success. In September, Kent began a months-long farewell tour that covered Sweden, Norway, Finland, and Denmark. The last concert was held at Tele2 Arena in Stockholm on 17 December 2016.

Kent reunited in March 2025 to play six concerts at Stockholm's 3Arena.

== History ==
=== Formation and first years (1990–1994) ===
The band Jones & Giftet (Jones & The Poison) was formed in 1990 with members Joakim "Jocke" Berg, Martin Sköld, Markus Mustonen, Sami Sirviö and Thomas Bergqvist (synthesizers). Berg and Sirviö started the band when Berg went to London and bought two guitars, one for each of them. Sköld, Bergqvist and Mustonen joined soon after. Their first gig was in Lindesberg in Västmanland, and the second at Knegoffs in Eskilstuna. In 1991, Jones & Giftet won the contest Cult 91 at the Skylight in Eskilstuna.

In 1992 Martin Roos played with Jones & Giftet for the first time, at Cult 92. Soon thereafter he replaced Thomas Bergqvist. On 30 September 1992 Jones & Giftet changed their name to Havsänglar (Angelshark, lit. Sea angels). Gigs at the "Spaghetti Companiet", Hannas Krog and the Pet Sounds Bar followed.

In 1993, Martin Roos moved to Stockholm, and soon the rest of the band did the same. Jocke Berg's brother Adam Berg came up with Kent as the band's new name. Kent played in Stockholm at Tanto and Hyndans Hörna, and in Uppsala at Kalmar Nation.

In March 1994 Kent recorded a 10-track demo under very simple conditions in an 8-track studio at Nytorpsskolan near Blåsut in Stockholm. They gave the demo to Peter Ejheden at Pet Sounds who was working as a booker for a club (Pet Sounds Bar). In the same chain of events where he got the tape, Ejheden quit Pet Sounds and started working at BMG. In April Per Lindholm, A&R at RCA/BMG, heard the band for the first time and was immediately interested. On 26 June Kent's first record contract was signed. They went to Silence Studios in Koppom, Värmland, to record their first album.

=== Kent and Verkligen (1995–1996) ===
In March 1995, Kent released their first album, Kent. The band's style at that time emphasized distortion, which is in contrast with their later albums. Their first single was "När det blåser på månen".

One year later, in March 1996, Kent released Verkligen (Really). Guitarist Martin Roos had left the band for his career at Kent's record company BMG; he later became the band's manager. The pre-release single "Kräm (så nära får ingen gå)" immediately became a radio hit and gained Kent some serious fame in Sweden. Two more singles were issued, "Gravitation" and "Halka". Musically, the album was slower with less distortion and more emotion. After Verkligen was released, and before the band went on a long tour that summer, guitarist Harri Mänty joined as a permanent member.

=== Isola (1997–1999) ===
In November 1997, Kent released Isola. They had toured heavily with Verkligen, which had gained them some reputation. The pre-release single from Isola, "Om du var här" (If You Were Here), became a radio hit. Musically the album was quite different from Verkligen, going further in the direction of slower, more thoughtful songs with more emotion. The last song on the album, the 7 minute, 47 second-long "747", with a characteristic keyboard riff and a long instrumental outro, became the band's closer for every show for the next six years. It was also released as a single, cut down to four minutes and with an added short chorus. The album reached number one in Sweden. Kent went on to tour through Scandinavia from November 1997 to February 1998.

In April 1998, Kent released an English version of Isola, featuring an extra song only available on the English version, "Velvet". In May, the band started touring again, playing in Europe and Scandinavia. Singles were released in various territories for three of the album's songs, "If You Were Here", "Things She Said" and "747". In 1999, they did two US tours to promote the album. The first was in support of fellow Swedes The Cardigans, and the second was a double bill with American band Papa Vegas. The English version of Isola sold poorly.

=== Hagnesta Hill and B-sidor 95-00 (1999–2000) ===
In the summer of 1999, the band started working on a new album. In December 1999, Kent released Hagnesta Hill, named after Hagnestahill, a part of Eskilstuna where the band had their first rehearsal space. The first single from the album, "Musik non stop", a disco-rock song, became a huge radio hit. The album was, for the most part, faster and less ballad-focused than Isola, and also mildly experimental with drum-machines and electronics. Two more singles were released, the industrial-esque "En himmelsk drog" (A Heavenly Drug) and the power-poppy "Kevlarsjäl" (Kevlar Soul).

In April 2000, an English version of Hagnesta Hill was released, in which two songs from the Swedish version were replaced with two new English tracks ("Just Like Money" and "Quiet Heart"). The album was also released in a limited digipack with one of the excluded songs, "A Timekill to Die For", included as a hidden bonus track. The album was accompanied by the release of the single "Music Non Stop"; the other omitted song, "Insects", was included as its b-side. A planned US release of the album was shelved, resulting in the circulation of "cut-out" promo copies. With no official album to promote, a US tour never materialized. In connection with the release of the English version of Hagnesta Hill, Kent went on a European tour, finishing at the Roskilde Festival.

Since their debut, Kent had recorded a large number of b-sides. Since most of them had long gone out of print, it was very hard to get them legally, so in November 2000, Kent released the two-CD collection B-sidor 95–00 (B-Sides 95–00). It featured 21 b-sides and two new songs. A documentary was also shot the same year, Så nära får ingen gå – ett år med Kent ("No One Can Get This Close – a year with Kent"), produced by Per Sinding-Larsen and Mathias Engstrand.

With heavy touring in Scandinavia and Europe in 2000, the band took a much-needed break.

=== Vapen & ammunition and the White Concert (2001–2003) ===
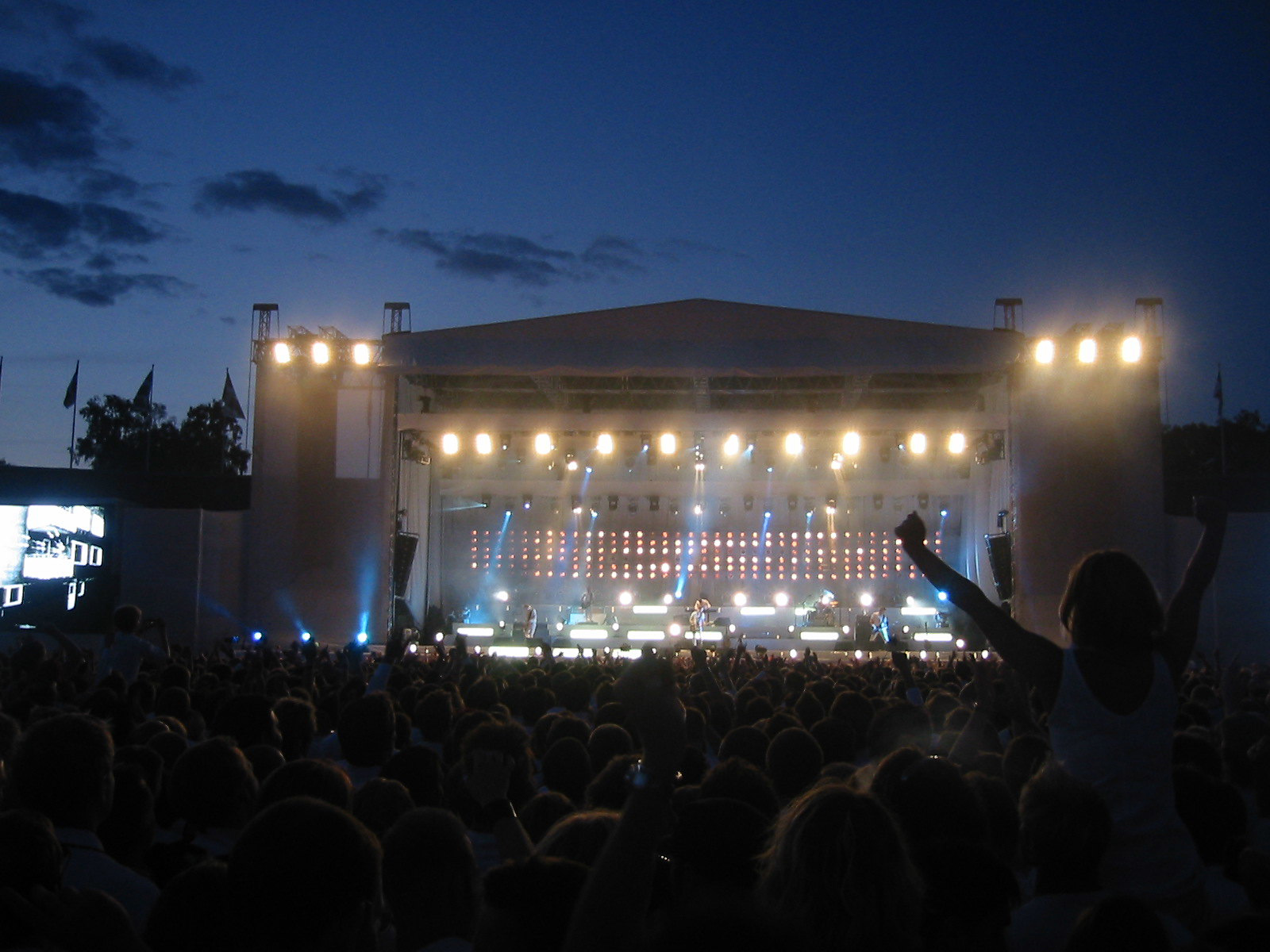
Kent performing at Stockholms stadion on 6 June 2003

In an interview in 2001, Joakim Berg was asked if they would tour outside Scandinavia again: "It's not too late yet. But the question is whether you have the energy to do all the marketing and all the crap that's required. I'm more interested in making great music than sitting on a tour bus for a year and a half."

After a seven-month timeout, Kent started another full-length album during the summer of 2001. Later that year they reported that they had tried to make an album with more radio-friendly songs. The first single from the album, "Dom andra" (The Others), released on 18 March 2002, became a huge hit on Swedish radio. When the album Vapen & ammunition (Weapon(s) & Ammunition) came out, the next two singles "Kärleken väntar" (Love Awaits) and "FF" (from the double A-side FF / VinterNoll2), plus the album track "Pärlor" (Pearls) became huge radio hits, resulting in album sales over 600,000, more than twice as many as any other Kent album to date. The band received seven Swedish Grammy Awards in 2003.

On 21 February 2003, it was announced that Kent would only do one performance in Sweden in 2003, on 6 June, the Swedish national day, in Stockholm Stadium which holds 30,000. As the band told the crowd to dress in white, it was nicknamed "The White Concert". The band also played at the less known Parkfestivalen in Moss, Norway on 14 June 2003.

=== Du & jag döden and The hjärta & smärta EP (2005–2006) ===
After taking a one-year timeout, Kent returned to the studio to record their sixth studio album in 2004. Studio reports said it would be "a very dark album". The first single "Max 500" was released on 9 February 2005 and reached number one in Sweden and Norway. The album Du & jag döden (You & Me Death) was released in March, it was well-received by critics and became a fan favorite. Two more singles were released, "Palace & Main" and "Den döda vinkeln" (The Dead Angle) – the last one stirring up some controversy among fans because Kent did not release any b-sides along with it (the single has a shorter version of the song). The last song on the album, "Mannen i den vita hatten (16 år senare)" (The Man in the White Hat (16 Years Later)) is seen by many as Kent's best effort. It also became the song to replace "747" as the concert closer.

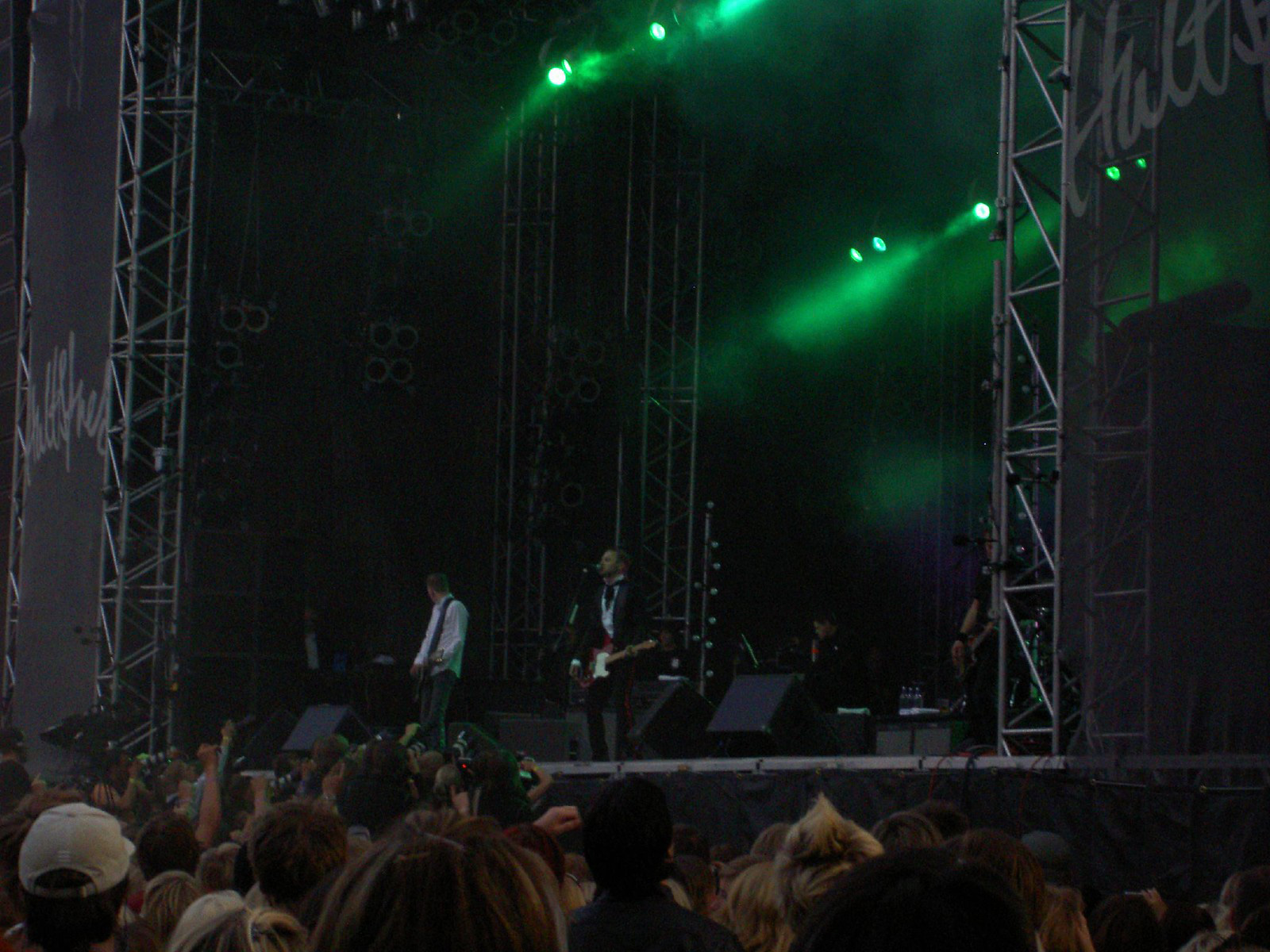
Kent performing at the Hultsfred Festival in June 2006

In May 2005, they embarked on "Turné 19" (Tour 19), doing 12 shows in Sweden, one in Norway and one in Finland. The concerts took place in huge tents with a capacity of up to 18,000. This was the only tour that followed the release of Du & jag döden. After "Turné 19", Kent played once more at the Roskilde Festival.

There were rumours about Kent releasing an EP, as they had been spotted in studio and guitarist Sami had said, "We might release an EP, but if we do it will only be digitally released." Just one month before the November 2005 release, The hjärta & smärta EP (The Heart & Pain EP) was confirmed, as a CD as well as a digital release. It was well received and contained five tracks, "Dom som försvann" (Those Who Disappeared) becoming the radio song and having a video recorded. The EP made No. 1 in Sweden and remained on the charts for 33 weeks.

At the 2005 Nordic Music Awards held at Forum København, Copenhagen, Kent received award for Best Nordic Artist. The award was presented by the British band Coldplay.

During 2006, the band played only once in Sweden on the Hultsfred Festival and on two festivals in Norway, Rockfest Haugesund and Norwegian Wood Festival. They've also released the single "Nålens öga" for Swedish Save the children.

=== Tillbaka till samtiden and Box 1991–2008 (2007–2008) ===
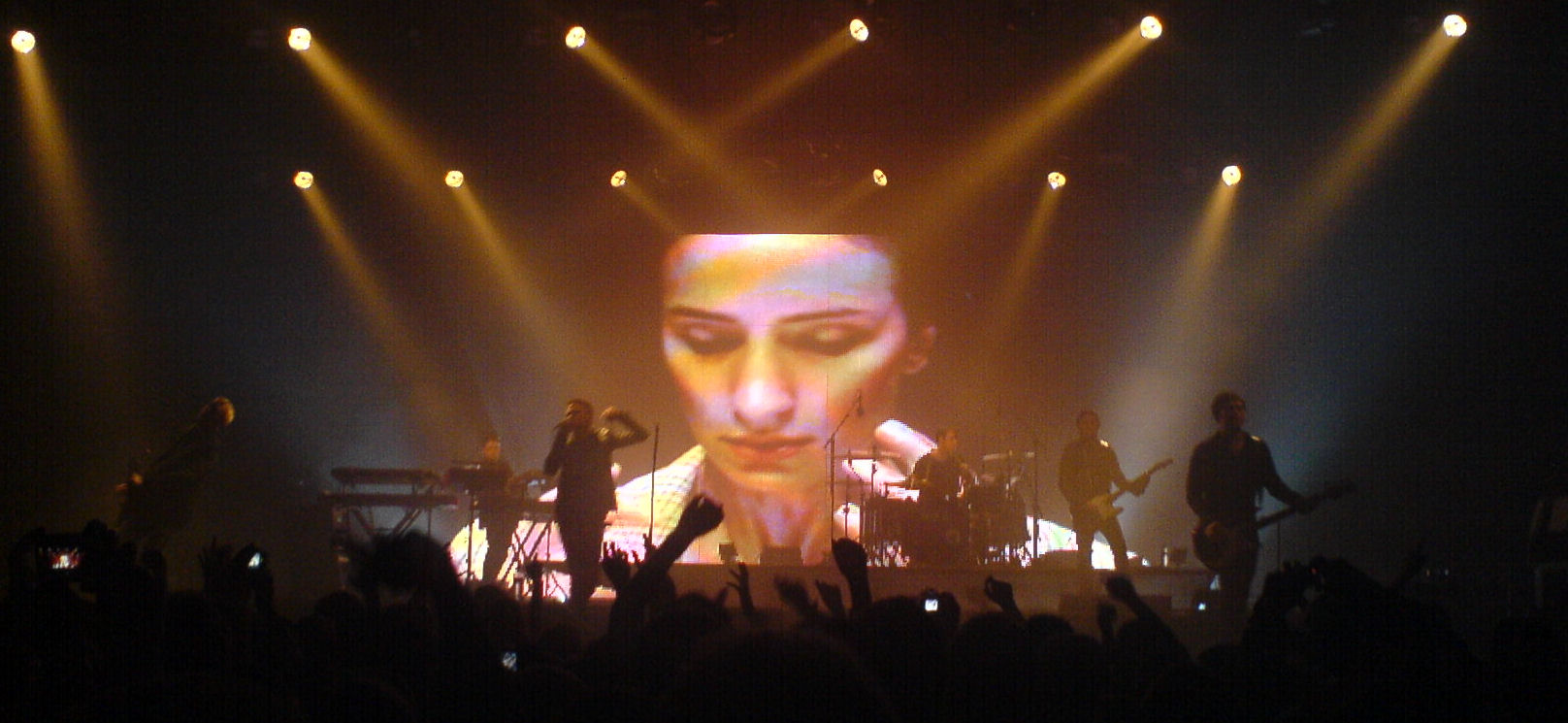
Kent performing in Halmstad in February 2008

In November 2006, the band started recording their seventh studio album. On 10 January 2007, it was announced that guitarist Harri Mänty had decided to leave the band after ten years.

"Ingenting" (2007)
Sample of "Ingenting" from the album Tillbaka till samtiden.

On 18 July 2007, the band announced the title and release date of their new album, Tillbaka till samtiden (Swedish for "Back to the Present"). Its official release was on 17 October 2007 but many stores began selling it five days in advance due to an internet leak of the album. The first single of the album was released on 17 September 2007 with the title "Ingenting" (Swedish for "Nothing"). The band played four songs at a private gig in Denmark where their new album premiered. The sound of the album has been described as more electro based rock. Due to the speed in which the tour's concerts were sold out, the band added seven extra concerts to their Scandinavian tour. Between November 2007 and March 2008, the band did 48 shows in total. Lead singer Joakim Berg has remarked that Tillbaka till samtiden contains some of his favourite material he has recorded. They were presented with Best Album and Best Group at the 2008 Swedish Grammy Awards. They went on to win a Rockbjörnen Award for Best Swedish Album and a P3 Guld Award for Best Group.

Kent's 2008 summer tour began on 27 June. At a concert in Norrköping on 1 August 2008, Berg said: "This is perhaps the best song that has ever been written in Swedish, it's called "Mannen i den vita hatten"." Kent released the compilation Box 1991–2008, featuring all their previous studio albums and previously unreleased material, in all Nordic countries on 29 October 2008.

In October 2008, their 2002 song "VinterNoll2" was included in Guitar Hero World Tour, becoming the first and to date only Swedish-language song to be included in a Guitar Hero game.

On 23 December 2008, Kent released a new song, "På drift?". "Kent wishes you all a Merry Christmas and a Happy New Year by offering a brand new song for free," the band writes on their website (kent.nu). It was made available for download on their official website for a limited time of one week from 23 to 31 December 2008.

=== Röd and En plats i solen (2009–2010) ===
On 4 October 2009, Kent announced their eighth studio album Röd and the first single "Töntarna" was released on 5 October as digital download. Röd was released on 5 November 2009 and has an even greater touch of synthesizers than previous albums. On the release day of Röd, Kent played in front of a hundred specially invited guests at The Bowery Hotel in New York. The setlist consisted of 6 tracks from the new album, and the whole thing was shown live on Aftonbladet's website.

On 2 November 2009, Kent auctioned off 100 limited physical copies of the song "2000" for charity. The song was also released as digital download. "2000" was used as the theme song for the Swedish TV-series Hemlösa, covering the homeless problem in Stockholm.

Kent's Röd tour started in Stockholm on 25 February 2010, with four shows in Globe Arena Annexet during that week. They did 18 shows in total around the Nordic countries (Sweden, Norway, Denmark and Finland) for this tour. In May 2010, Sony Computer Entertainment Europe, in collaboration with Sony Music Sweden AB, released SingStar Kent on both the PlayStation 2 and PlayStation 3 games consoles, as part of the SingStar music video games.

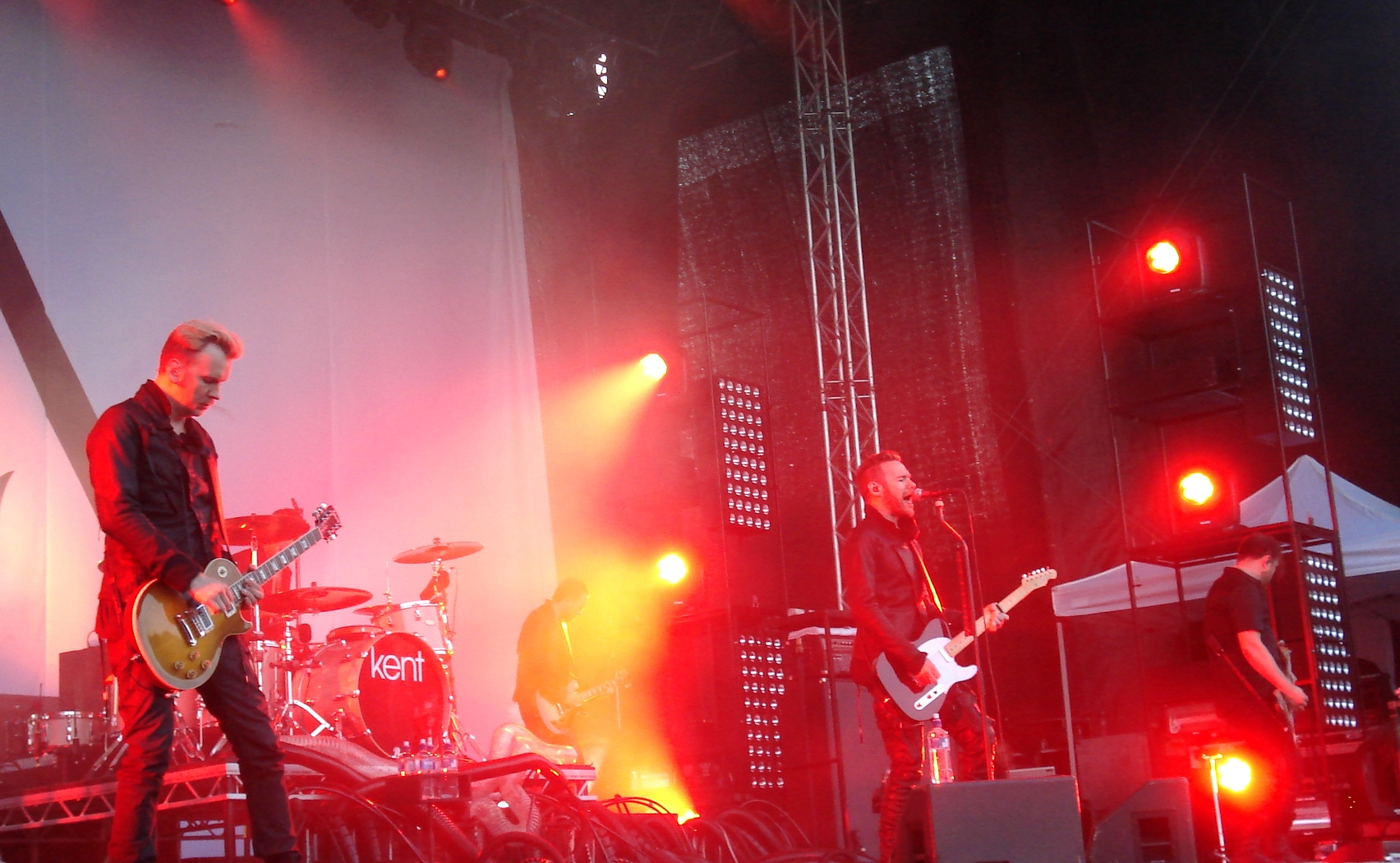
Kent performing in July 2010

On 14 June 2010, Kent announced their ninth studio album, En plats i solen (Swedish for "A Place in the Sun") due for release on 30 June, only seven months after the release of their previous studio album, Röd. Berg has said about the recording of En plats i solen: "We had a kind of idea that we were going to record an album very quickly this time, we had already some demos ready. We wanted to go into the studio, record and mix the album and then distribute it directly." Unlike the two previous albums, which were produced with Danish producer Joshua, En plats i solen is produced with Swedish producer Stefan Boman who worked with the band on Du & jag döden (2005). The band also released the first single from the forthcoming album, featuring the two A-sides "Gamla Ullevi" and "Skisser för sommaren".

Kent embarked on a summer tour in Sweden, Norway, Finland and Denmark, starting at the Peace & Love Festival in Sweden and finishing on 8 August at the Skanderborg Festival in Denmark. On 1 September 2010, the band won a Rockbjörnen Award for Best Live Band.

=== Jag är inte rädd för mörkret and Tigerdrottningen (2012–2015) ===
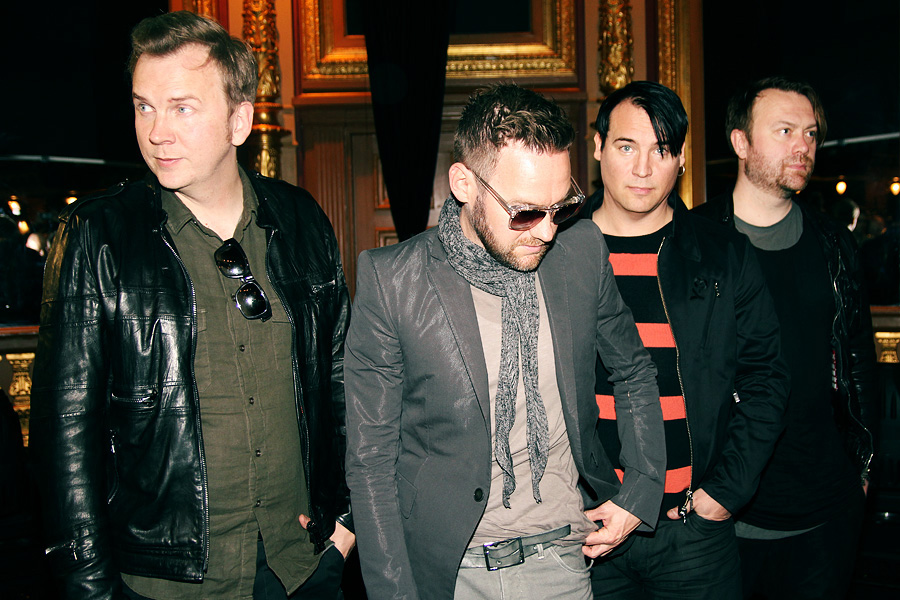
Kent after the press conference at Berns in Stockholm on 24 April 2012 (from left to right): Sirviö, Berg, Mustonen, and Sköld

On 22 June 2011, Kent signed a recording contract with Universal Music in Sweden, after sixteen years with BMG and later Sony Music. The band's manager, Martin Roos, said in a press release: "After sixteen years with BMG/Sony Music it feels great with a new beginning, and Universal Music gave us the best offer." In April 2012, Kent released their tenth studio album, Jag är inte rädd för mörkret (Swedish for "I Am Not Afraid of the Dark"). It was recorded in France. Three singles were released from the album, "999", "Jag ser dig" and "Tänd på". Jag är inte rädd för mörkret is piano-based.

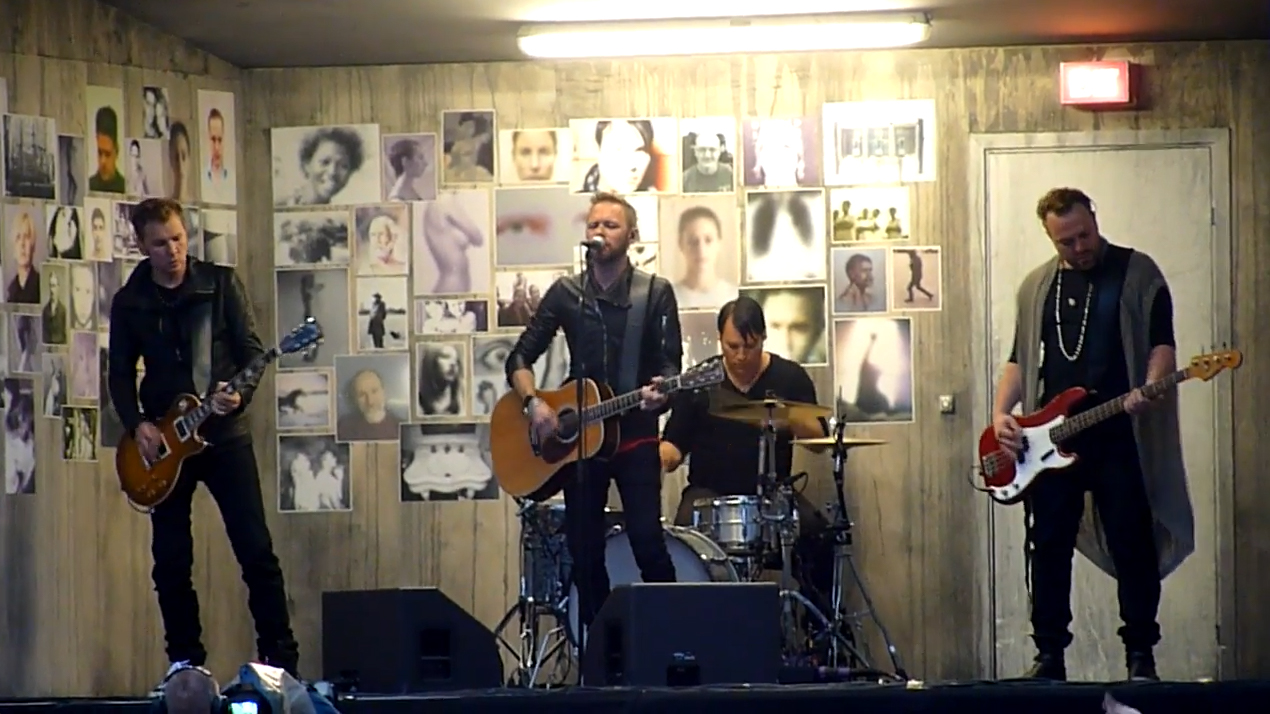
Kent performing in August 2012

During the summer, Kent toured Scandinavia, first with a short spring tour at the end of May (24 May–2 June) and then at festivals and own concerts in Sweden, Norway, Finland and Denmark during June, July and August. During this summer tour they started their concerts with an old unreleased song named "Ögon" from the early 1990s, with a new version of the song. The song was included in the 2008 compilation Box 1991–2008, but only as a demo.

In December 2012, Kent announced on their Twitter account that they were to release a track on New Year's Day called "Ingen kunde röra oss".

On 13 February 2013, it was announced that Kent, Robyn and Lars Winnerbäck would play at the opening of Tele2 Arena on August 24 of that year. This was the only live performance by the band that year. At the end of the show, Joakim Berg announced that the band would begin recording a new studio album in December.

On 29 November 2013, Kent went to Los Angeles and recorded their eleventh studio album, Berg said in an interview: "We wanted to do this kind of Fleetwood Mac thing and go to LA and dream under the sun. Now the dollar is so low, in addition – all the big studios are empty, no one uses them anymore." The first single "La Belle Epoque" was released on 12 March 2014 and the album Tigerdrottningen was released on 30 April. The album features a lot of female backing vocals and duets. During the month of May Kent went on a small club tour in Norway, Sweden and Denmark. In the summer of 2014 Kent held their own festival called Kentfest in Gothenburg and Stockholm. They also played at festivals in Denmark and Norway.

In June 2015, Kent played at three festivals in Scandinavia, Joakim Berg announced at the Bråvalla festival that they were going to record a new album that fall. That year, Kent celebrated the 20th anniversary of their debut album, Kent, by releasing the band's first 10 albums on vinyl.

=== Då som nu för alltid and the final tour (2016) ===
In February 2016, Kent was inducted into the Swedish Music Hall of Fame. On 13 March 2016, the band posted a cryptic video titled "Då Som Nu För Alltid" on their YouTube channel where the video ends with the text "Last album, last tour". On 14 March, it was announced that Då som nu för alltid (Swedish for "Then as Now Forever") would be their last album, and that they would make a final tour in the Nordic countries, with the last concert in Stockholm in December 2016. "Egoist" was announced as the album's first single, and it was released on 14 March. However, on 17 April 2016, Kent announced the track listing which omitted "Egoist". Instead, "Vi är inte längre där" was released as the album's first single on 3 May. The album Då som nu för alltid was released on 20 May 2016. On 24 August, it was announced the compilation album Best of would be released on 16 September 2016, containing 20 previously released tracks and four new studio recordings. For Då som nu för alltid the band won two Swedish Grammy Awards, Best Album and Best Rock.

From the spring of 2015 until the band's very last concert, Per Sinding-Larsen followed Kent's last time together to record a documentary called Vi är inte längre där (Sista åren med Kent), which was shown on SVT in two parts on the 26 and 27 December 2016. The documentary revealed, among other things, that Harri Mänty was fired from the band due to excessive partying and not that he left off his own accord as has been previously stated.

=== Post-Kent activities (2017–present) ===
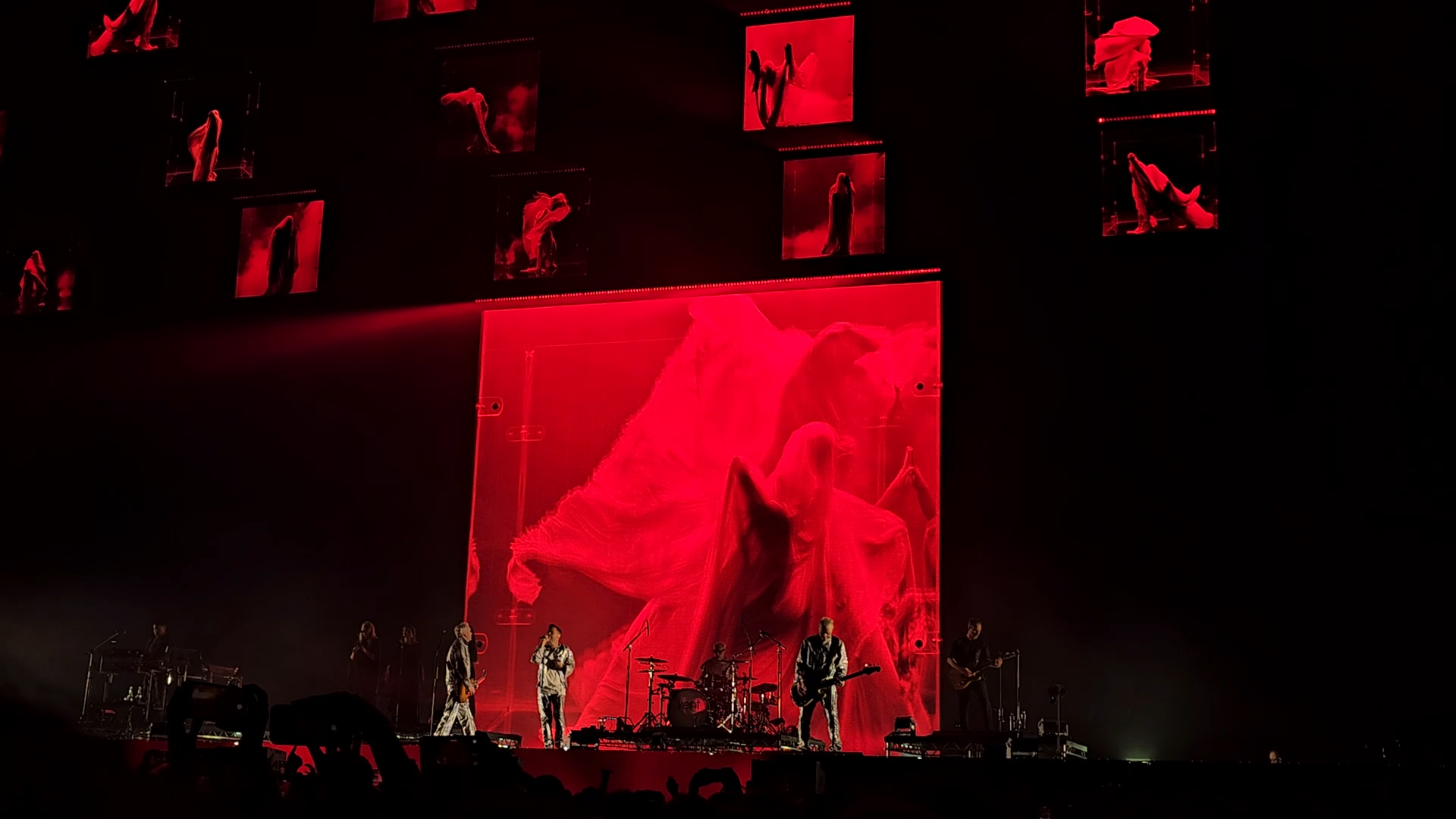
Kent performing in Stockholm on 21 March 2025

After 2016, Joakim Berg has written and produced songs with a number of different artists, such as Veronica Maggio, Ghost, Smith & Thell and Lars Winnerbäck. In May 2022, Berg released a solo album, Jag fortsätter glömma. He has also worked with his former bandmate Martin Sköld after the dissolution of the band.

In April 2024, Berg said on a podcast that the band had discussed the possibility for a live reunion. On 18 October 2024, Kent announced three concerts in Stockholm's 3Arena in March 2025. Due to the tickets quickly selling out, three additional concerts were announced, which also all sold out. The six concerts took place on 21-23 March and 25-27 March 2025. A total of 239,953 people attended the concerts, giving Kent the audience record for a single artist in 3Arena. Berg emphasised onstage that Kent would not reunite again following these concerts.

On 29 May 2026, Joakim Berg released his second solo album, Framtiden som aldrig blev av.

== Musical style and influences ==
Kent have been grouped with various genres, including alternative rock, indie rock, pop rock, synth-pop, pop, and arena rock.

Kent has been referred to as Sweden's biggest rock band, but has always put pop melodies in focus. Kent's biggest change in musical style came with the band's seventh studio album Tillbaka till samtiden, which marked a clear shift from alternative rock to synthpop/rock.

Their music has been described as dark and melancholic. "Through twelve albums and a number of radio hits, Joakim Berg and co. have been among the foremost ambassadors of Scandinavian song lyrics and Nordic melancholy." Their 2005 concert at the Roskilde Festival was described as a "beautiful depression" and was given 9/10 by Jørn Gjersøe from NRK.

Berg, the lead singer and lyricist, says "there are two kinds of lyrics I write. One kind is based in places and the other is based in feelings. You move between those two whether you want to or not." The lyrics of the song "Mannen i den vita hatten (16 år senare)" contain the lines "Jag är livrädd för att leva / Och jag är dödsrädd för att dö / Men älskling vi ska alla en gång dö / Ja, vi ska alla en gång dö" (I am scared out of my life of living / And I am scared to death of dying / But darling we will all one day die / Yes, we will all one day die).

Kent's influences include the Cure, U2, Depeche Mode and My Bloody Valentine.

== Band members ==
Members

- Joakim Berg – lead vocals, guitars (1990–2016, 2025)
- Martin Sköld – bass, keyboards (1990–2016, 2025)
- Sami Sirviö – guitars (1990–2016, 2025)
- Markus Mustonen – drums, backing vocals (1990–2016, 2025)
- Harri Mänty – guitars (1996–2006)
- Martin Roos – guitars (1992–1995)
- Thomas Bergquist – keyboards (1990–1992)

Touring musicians

- Andreas Bovin – keyboards, piano, guitars (1996–2016, 2025)
- Max Brandt – guitars (2007–2016, 2025)
- Ida Redig – backing vocals (2014–2015)
- Miriam Bryant – backing vocals (2014–2015)
- Naomi Pilgrim – backing vocals (2014–2015)
- Carolina Wallin Pérez – backing vocals (2015–2016, 2025)
- Daniela Rathana – backing vocals (2016)
- Malin Brudell – backing vocals (2016, 2025)
- Maria Jane Smith – backing vocals (2025)

== Discography ==
Studio albums

- Kent (1995)
- Verkligen (1996)
- Isola (1997)
- Hagnesta Hill (1999)
- Vapen & ammunition (2002)
- Du & jag döden (2005)
- Tillbaka till samtiden (2007)
- Röd (2009)
- En plats i solen (2010)
- Jag är inte rädd för mörkret (2012)
- Tigerdrottningen (2014)
- Då som nu för alltid (2016)

== Awards and nominations ==
Kent have won 22 Grammis awards (the Swedish equivalent of the Grammy Awards) and 12 Rockbjörnen awards.

== See also ==
- Music of Sweden
