= Papa Vegas =

American rock band

- Origin: Grand Rapids, Michigan, United States
- Genres: Alternative rock, post-grunge
- Label: RCA Records
- Members: Joel Ferguson - Vocals, Guitars Pete Dunning - Backing Vocals, Guitars; Scott Stefanski - Drums, Backing Vocals; Mick Force - bass guitar John Conners – bass guitar, vocals Randy Tate – keyboards, vocals

Papa Vegas is a rock band from the 1990s. They released two studio albums and were signed to RCA Records.

Papa Vegas was founded in Grand Rapids, Michigan, where vocalist Joel Ferguson and guitarist Pete Dunning first began playing together. Dunning and Ferguson collaborated for three years before parting ways for individual projects, and Ferguson played under the name "Papa Vegas" with a variety of other musicians. After playing with Papa Vegas at a battle of the bands competition, they were heard by Brian Vander Ark, then lead singer of The Verve Pipe, who signed them to his Sid Flips label and produced their debut EP, Grounded, with Pete Dunning back on lead guitar, Scott Stefanski on drums, and original bassist Mick Force.

Sid Flips was folded into RCA, and the group was set up with Don Gilmore to produce their debut full-length album. Tom Lord-Alge mixed; the result was released as Hello Vertigo in April 1999. All songs on the album were written by Joel Ferguson with the exception of "Sermon Underground", which was co-written by Joel Ferguson and Pete Dunning. Their biggest hit single was "Bombshell", which peaked at #20 on the Billboard Modern Rock Tracks chart in 1999. Following the album's release, they toured with the Verve Pipe and also Kent, a critically acclaimed band from Stockholm then touring the US under RCA's European label, and had a lesser hit with the release of "Something Wrong" but the full-length did not sell as well as hoped, and no further hit singles followed. The group was dropped from the RCA label in March 2000 and split up shortly afterward.

In December 2004, the band reunited to play a large venue show with The Verve Pipe. The show was a success, and they repeated it in December 2005. Ferguson, Stefanski and Dunning re-grouped for various projects on and off in the years that followed, most notably Miles to Mars. Pete Dunning went on to play in the Grand Rapids groups Molly who was also on Sid Flips, White Rabbit And Barrel Bones while Scott Stefanski and Joel Ferguson played in The Verve Pipe.

In January 2009 Papa Vegas re-grouped as a five-piece with John Connors replacing Force on bass, and adding Randy Tate on keyboards. The band played shows in their home state of Michigan while working on their second album, Gravity Wars, released on their own Shiver Music label in 2011.

== Band members ==
=== Current members ===
- Joel Ferguson – vocals, guitars
- Pete Dunning – backing vocals, guitars
- Scott Stefanski – drums, backing vocals
- Mick Force - bass guitar

=== Former Members ===
Jon Connors - bass guitar Randy Tate - keyboards

== Discography ==
=== Grounded (1997, Sid Flips) ===
1. Bombshell - 3:48
2. Never - 3:26
3. Long Days - 3:34
4. Little Kisses (early version of "Something Wrong") - 2:52
5. Mesmerized - 3:35

=== Hello Vertigo (1999, RCA Records) ===
1. Something Wrong - 3:00
2. Bombshell - 3:59
3. Super Telepathy - 3:37
4. Mesmerized - 3:46
5. Long Days - 4:17
6. Reason Without Meaning - 4:37
7. No Destination - 3:51
8. Beautiful Animal - 2:58
9. Through To You - 3:07
10. Sermon Underground - 3:53
11. On Your Own - 3:53
12. Resolve - 4:13

=== Gravity Wars (2011) ===
1. Comfort - 3:49
2. Find Another Way - 3:16
3. She's Made of Stone - 3:54
4. Before Our Eyes - 3:28
5. Battle Hymn of the Fearless Yard Gnome - 2:27
6. Drained - 3:33
7. One I Left Behind - 3:38
8. Shoes - 3:42
