= Sami Sirviö =

Swedish musician

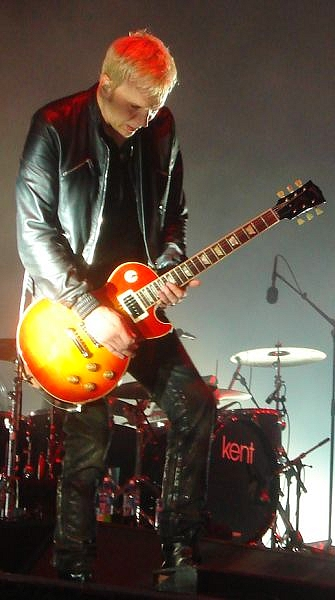
- Sami on stage in Helsingborg

Background information
- Born: Sami Petteri Sirviö; 28 May 1970 (age 56)
- Origin: Eskilstuna, Sweden
- Genres: Rock, alternative rock
- Occupations: Musician, songwriter
- Instruments: Guitar, keyboards
- Formerly of: Kent

Sami Sirviö (born 28 May 1970) is a Sweden Finnish musician and former lead guitarist of the now discontinued Swedish rock band Kent.

== Biography ==
Sirviö formed Kent in 1990 along with vocalist Joakim Berg, bassist Martin Sköld, drummer Markus Mustonen and keyboardist Thomas Bergqvist. The band originally called themselves Jones & Giftet before changing their name first to Havsänglar and later Kent. By that time Bergqvist had been fired from the band and replaced by Martin Roos. After the release of the bands self-titled debut album Roos quit the band to focus on a career at BMG, the band soon recruited Harri Mänty as a replacement. The band continued to release several critically and commercially successful albums with that line-up intact until 2006 when rhythm guitarist Harri Mänty left the band. Instead of recruiting a permanent replacement Sirviö along with Jocke Berg recorded guitars for their 2007 release Tillbaka till samtiden. For live performances the band has since brought along Max Brandt as a non-official guitarist. Besides his role in Kent Sirviö has also appeared on Lisa Miskovsky's 2006 album Changes as well as produce a number of records for Swedish and Finnish artists.

In 2005 Sirviö married his girlfriend of six years Jennie Persson, at the Maria Magdalena Church in Stockholm.

== Musical equipment ==
Sirviö long used a variety of Gibson Les Paul models with the original humbuckers replaced with P-94 single coil pickups during recording and live performances; however, for the recording of Tillbaka till samtiden Sirviö primarily used a 1967 Fender Custom Telecaster. Occasionally Sirviö uses an e-bow on his guitar, often combined with a delay pedal. Sirviö's main amplifier for the recording was a 1963 Vox AC30 but a 1954 Fender Concert and a 1964 Hiwatt Custom 100 were also used. For live performances, Sirviö uses a new Hiwatt amplifier with a 4x12 cabinet.

== Discography ==
With Kent

- Kent (1995)
- Verkligen (1996)
- Isola (1997)
- Isola (English) (1998)
- Hagnesta Hill (1999)
- Hagnesta Hill (English) (2000)
- Vapen & ammunition (2002)
- Du & jag döden (2005)
- The hjärta & smärta EP (2005)
- Tillbaka till samtiden (2007)
- Box 1991–2008 (2008)
- Röd (2009)
- En plats i solen (2010)
- Jag är inte rädd för mörkret (2012)
- Tigerdrottningen (2014)
- Då som nu för alltid (2016)

As a producer

- Petrol – Record (1997)
- Mobile Homes – EP (2003)
- Jay Jay Johanson – Tell all the girls im back in town (Remix) (2004)
- Sapporo 72 – Business and Pleasure (2005)
- West End Girls – Goes Petshopping (2006)
- Disco – Vihaa, rakkautta vai jotain muuta (2006)
- Mobile Homes – Close (2008)

As a guest musician

- Lisa Miskovsky – Changes (2006)
