= Då som nu för alltid =

2016 album by Kent

Studio album by Kent
- Released: 20 May 2016
- Recorded: October 2015 – March 2016
- Studio: Electric Lady Studios (New York City): Hamsterdam Studios (Stockholm)
- Genres: Alternative rock, pop rock
- Length: 53:22
- Labels: RCA, Sony Music
- Producer: Kent

Kent chronology
Tigerdrottningen (2014)	Då som nu för alltid (2016)	Best Of (2016)

Singles from Då som nu för alltid
- 1. "Vi är inte längre där" Released: 3 May 2016

Professional ratings
Review scores
Source	Rating
Aftonbladet	4/5 stars
Aftenposten	4/6 stars
Expressen	4/5 stars
Gaffa	4/6 stars
Göteborgs-Posten	4/5 stars
Svenska Dagbladet	5/6 stars

Då som nu för alltid (Swedish for Then as Now Forever) is the twelfth and final studio album by Swedish alternative rock band Kent. The album was released on 20 May 2016 by RCA Records and Sony Music. It was Kent's first album on Sony Music since En plats i solen (2010).

== Background and recording ==
In June 2015, Expressen reported that Kent were to record their twelfth studio album in Electric Lady Studios in New York City later that year. On 19 December, Kent posted a picture on their official Facebook page and wrote, "Thanks for now, Electric Lady Studios".

They had 17 songs with them when they went to record in New York. The three songs "Egoist", "Om du visste vad du ville" and "Silver" did not make it onto the album, but were instead released on the compilation album Best of.

The album was produced by Kent.

== Promotion ==
On 13 March 2016, the band posted a cryptic video titled "Då Som Nu För Alltid" on their YouTube channel where the video ends with the text "Last album, last tour". On 14 March, it was announced that Då som nu för alltid would be their last album. "Egoist" was announced as the album's first single, and it was released on the same date. However, on 17 April 2016 Kent announced the track listing which omitted "Egoist". Instead, "Vi är inte längre där" was released as the album's first single on 3 May.

A music video for "Den vänstra stranden" was released on 16 June. A music video for "Den sista sången" was released on 18 December 2016.

== Critical reception ==
Anders Nunstedt of Expressen wrote: "Då som nu för alltid grows with each listen. [...] The songs reflect a band that decided to quit, not a band that gave up. A large part of the strength lies in Kent's feeling for the details."

Håkan Steen of Aftonbladet wrote: "The single 'Vi är inte längre där' sounds even better placed in its context on the album. Very much the essence of late Kent, grand melancholy pop. [...] 'Den sista sången', sad – of course – farewell ballad set in California and New York. It may be about a relationship, but of course it's also a farewell to the audience. A children's choir tunes in and not an eye is dry."

Sara-Märta Höglund of Svenska Dagbladet wrote: "What I hear are four legends of self-awareness who leave the youth behind - who have the guts to quit while they're still on top."

Fredrik Strage of Dagens Nyheter wrote: "Då som nu för alltid is a soft continuation of the synth rock that the band developed on their last records: light disco beats, airy choruses, clear guitar loops and an elegant melancholy. The music is more pleasant than bombastic and not the least bit goth."

== Track listing ==
All lyrics are written by Joakim Berg; all music is composed by Joakim Berg; except "Den sista sången" written by Joakim Berg, Liv Berg, Ava Berg and Sixten Berg.

Då som nu för alltid track listing
No.	Title	Length
1.	"Andromeda"	4:36
2.	"Tennsoldater" (Tin Soldiers)	4:08
3.	"Vi är för alltid" (We Are Forever)	4:51
4.	"Den vänstra stranden" (The Left Bank)	4:46
5.	"Nattpojken & Dagflickan" (The Night Boy & The Day Girl) (with Anna Ternheim)	3:56
6.	"Vi är inte längre där" (We Are No Longer There)	5:19
7.	"Förlåtelsen" (The Forgiveness)	5:55
8.	"Skyll inte ifrån dig" (Don't Blame Someone Else)	4:29
9.	"Gigi"	3:53
10.	"Falska profeter" (False Prophets)	6:19
11.	"Den sista sången" (The Last Song)	5:16

== Personnel ==
Credits adapted from the liner notes of Då som nu för alltid.

Kent

- Joakim Berg – music, lyrics, vocals, guitar, backing vocals, keyboards, piano, programming
- Martin Sköld – bass, keyboards, programming
- Sami Sirviö – guitar, keyboards, programming
- Markus Mustonen – drums, backing vocals, percussion, keyboards, piano

Additional musicians

- Naomi Pilgrim – backing vocals on track 1, 2, 3, 4
- Carolina Wallin Pérez – backing vocals on track 1, 2, 3, 4
- Anna Ternheim – vocals on track 5
- Liv Berg – music on track 11, lyrics on track 11, backing vocals on track 11
- Ava Berg – music on track 11, lyrics on track 11, backing vocals on track 11
- Sixten Berg – music on track 11, lyrics on track 11, synth bass on track 11
- Samuel Bergsten – backing vocals on track 11
- Leo Coval – backing vocals on track 11
- Axel Henriksson – backing vocals on track 11
- Sofia Magnusson – backing vocals on track 11

Technical

- Kent – producer
- Stefan Boman – recording, mixing on track 2, 4, 9, 11
- Gosha Usov – studio assistant
- Michael Ilbert – mixing on track 1, 3, 5, 6, 7, 10
- Simon Sigfridsson – recording, mixing on track 8
- Joakim Berg – recording, mixing on track 8
- Sami Sirviö – recording
- Emily Lazar – mastering
- Chris Allgood – mastering assistant

Artwork

- Thomas Ökvist – design
- Peter Gehrke – photography

== Charts ==
=== Weekly charts ===
Weekly chart performance for Då som nu för alltid
Chart (2016)	Peak position
Danish Albums (Hitlisten)	13
Finnish Albums (Suomen virallinen lista)	3
South Korean Albums (Circle)	61
Norwegian Albums (VG-lista)	5
Swedish Albums (Sverigetopplistan)	1

=== Year-end charts ===
Year-end chart performance for Då som nu för alltid
Chart (2016)	Position
Swedish Albums (Sverigetopplistan)	2
Chart (2017)	Position
Swedish Albums (Sverigetopplistan)	14
Chart (2018)	Position
Swedish Albums (Sverigetopplistan)	46
