= Var är vi nu? =

2014 single by Kent

Single by Kent

from the album Tigerdrottningen
- Released: 25 July 2014
- Studio: Conway (Los Angeles)
- Genre: Alternative rock
- Length: 4:20
- Label: Sonet, Universal
- Songwriter: Joakim Berg
- Producers: Kent, Daniel Alexander, Stefan Boman

Kent singles chronology
"La Belle Epoque" (2014)	"Var är vi nu?" (2014)	"Egoist" (2016)

Music video
- "Var är vi nu?" on YouTube

"Var är vi nu?" (Swedish for Where Are We Now?) is a song by Swedish alternative rock band Kent. It was released in July 2014 as the second single from the album Tigerdrottningen. It was released as a 7" vinyl but also as a digital download. The vinyl is limited to 1500 copies. The B-side contains an alternate version of "Var är vi nu?".

== Music video ==
The music video for "Var är vi nu?" was directed by John Boisen and Björn Fävremark at Is This It. It premiered on YouTube on 26 May 2014. The video was shot in one unbroken shot, featuring the band playing the song.

== Track listing ==
- 7" vinyl single
1. "Var är vi nu?" – 4:20
2. "Var är vi nu? (Alternate version)" – 4:17
- Digital download
1. "Var är vi nu? (Alternate version)" – 4:17

== Charts ==
=== Weekly charts ===
Weekly chart performance for "Var är vi nu?"
Chart (2014)	Peak position
Sweden (Sverigetopplistan)	21
