= Tigerdrottningen =

2014 album by Kent

Studio album by Kent
- Released: 30 April 2014
- Recorded: December 2013 – February 2014
- Studio: Conway Studios (Los Angeles)
- Genres: Alternative rock, pop rock
- Length: 48:42
- Labels: Sonet, Universal
- Producers: Kent, Daniel Alexander, Stefan Boman

Kent chronology
Jag är inte rädd för mörkret (2012)	Tigerdrottningen (2014)	Då som nu för alltid (2016)

Singles from Tigerdrottningen
- 1. "La Belle Epoque" Released: 12 March 2014; 2. "Var är vi nu?" Released: 25 July 2014; 3. "Mirage" Released: 3 September 2014

Professional ratings
Review scores
Source	Rating
Aftonbladet	4/5 stars
Expressen	4/5 stars
Gaffa	4/6 stars
Göteborgs-Posten	4/5 stars
Svenska Dagbladet	5/6 stars

Tigerdrottningen (Swedish for The Tiger Queen) is the eleventh studio album by Swedish alternative rock band Kent. It was released on 30 April 2014 by Sonet Records (Universal Music).

Lyrically, Tigerdrottningen is more politically charged than previous albums.

== Background and recording ==
On 24 August 2013, Kent played at the opening of Tele2 Arena. At the end of the show, Joakim Berg announced that they would begin recording a new album in December.

On 29 November, the band traveled to Los Angeles. On 2 December, the recording of the band's eleventh studio album began. The album was recorded over three weeks at Conway Studios in December 2013. "We wanted to do this kind of Fleetwood Mac thing and go to LA and dream under the sun. Now the dollar is so low, in addition – all the big studios are empty, no one uses them anymore," Berg said in an interview.

The album was produced together with Daniel Alexander and Stefan Boman.

== Promotion ==
The lead single, "La Belle Epoque", was released on 12 March 2014, and reached number eight in Sweden (Sverigetopplistan).

Three promotional singles were released from Tigerdrottningen through Spotify preceding the album's release: "Skogarna" on 25 April, "Godhet" on 26 April and "Din enda vän" on 27 April 2014.

"Var är vi nu?" was released as the album's second single on 25 July 2014.

== Critical reception ==
Anders Nunstedt of Expressen wrote: "The songs have a drive that goes in line with the hits Swedish songwriters have delivered to the charts worldwide in recent years. Kent has gone from being a reliable indie band to a pop phenomenon. Tigerdrottningen has more in common with Katy Perry's Roar than their debut. [...] The melodies don't always make it all the way, but Tigerdrottningen is an impressive work."

Sara-Märta Höglund of Svenska Dagbladet wrote: "At Tigerrottningen the best of "old" and "new" Kent meet. Closing 'Den andra sidan' is striking in the same way as 'Beskyddaren' from Hagnesta Hill and with guitar loops that are made to echo out in the summer night. While 'Din enda vän' - which opens with a sample from the film adaptation of Bonjour tristesse - is representative of where they are now. The programmed sound has been included in the new soundscape - where strong melodies are the focus."

== Commercial performance ==
Tigerdrottningen debuted at number one on the Swedish Albums Chart on the chart dated 9 May 2014, becoming Kent's tenth consecutive number-one album. The same week the album was certified gold for 20,000 copies sold. On the chart dated 5 June 2014, the album was certified platinum for 40,000 copies sold.

== Track listing ==
All lyrics are written by Joakim Berg.

Tigerdrottningen track listing
No.	Title	Music	Length
1.	"Mirage"	Joakim Berg	5:35
2.	"Var är vi nu?" (Where Are We Now?)	Berg	4:20
3.	"Skogarna" (The Forests)	Berg	3:51
4.	"La Belle Epoque"	Berg	3:58
5.	"Svart snö" (Black Snow)	Berg	4:08
6.	"Allt har sin tid" (Everything Has Its Time)	Berg	5:12
7.	"Innan himlen faller ner" (Before the Sky Falls Down)	Berg	3:52
8.	"Din enda vän" (Your Only Friend)	Berg	4:19
9.	"Godhet" (Goodness) (with Beatrice Eli)	Berg	4:22
10.	"Simmaren" (The Swimmer)	Berg	3:55
11.	"Den andra sidan" (The Other Side)	Berg, Martin Sköld	5:04

- "Din enda vän" contains excerpts from Bonjour Tristesse.

== Personnel ==
Credits adapted from the liner notes of Tigerdrottningen.

Kent

- Joakim Berg – music, lyrics, vocals, guitar, backing vocals, keyboards, piano, programming
- Martin Sköld – music on track 11, bass, keyboards, programming
- Sami Sirviö – guitar, keyboards, programming
- Markus Mustonen – drums, backing vocals, percussion, keyboards, piano

Additional musicians

- Rudie Edwards – backing vocals on track 1, 2, 3, 5, 6
- Beatrice Eli – vocals on track 9, backing vocals on track 1, 2, 5, 6
- Petra Marklund – backing vocals on track 5, 6, 9, 10
- Camela Leierth – backing vocals on track 5, 6
- Erik Hassle – backing vocals on track 4
- Martin Sandberg – backing vocals on track 2
- Compton Gospel Choir (Yalonda Dancy, Talitha Manor, Katherine Dancy, and Angela Allen) – vocals on track 7

Technical

- Kent – producer
- Daniel Alexander – producer
- Stefan Boman – producer, recording, mixer
- Saska Becker – production assistant
- Simon Sigfridsson – assistant engineer
- Martin Brengesjö – instrument technician
- Eric Eylands – studio assistant
- Ted Jensen – mastering

Artwork

- Thomas Ökvist – design
- Peter Gehrke – photography

== Charts and certifications ==
=== Weekly charts ===
Weekly chart performance for Tigerdrottningen
Chart (2014)	Peak position
Danish Albums (Hitlisten)	3
Finnish Albums (Suomen virallinen lista)	6
Norwegian Albums (VG-lista)	1
Swedish Albums (Sverigetopplistan)	1

=== Year-end charts ===
Year-end chart performance for Tigerdrottningen
Chart (2014)	Position
Swedish Albums (Sverigetopplistan)	2
Chart (2015)	Position
Swedish Albums (Sverigetopplistan)	44
Chart (2016)	Position
Swedish Albums (Sverigetopplistan)	52

=== Certifications ===
Region	Certification	Certified units/sales
Sweden (GLF)	Platinum	40,000^{‡}
^{‡} Sales+streaming figures based on certification alone.
