= The hjärta & smärta EP =

2005 extended play by Kent

EP by Kent
- Released: 28 October 2005
- Recorded: August–September 2005
- Studio: Park Studio (Stockholm)
- Genre: Alternative rock
- Length: 21:19
- Labels: RCA, Sony BMG
- Producers: Kent, Nille Perned, Stefan Boman

Kent chronology
| Du & jag döden (2005) | The hjärta & smärta EP (2005) | Tillbaka till samtiden (2007) |

Professional ratings
Review scores
| Source | Rating |
|---|---|
| Aftonbladet | 4/5 stars |
| BA | 4/6 stars |
| Dagens Skiva | 8/10 |
| GAFFA | 4/6 stars |
| Nöjesguiden | 5/6 stars |

The hjärta & smärta EP (Swedish for The Heart & Pain EP) is an EP by Swedish alternative rock band Kent. It was released digitally on 28 October and physically on 2 November 2005. The production of the EP was kept secret and it was announced just one month before its release. The CD and cover slip, in contrast to Kent's previous release Du & jag döden, are both almost completely white. In 2006, the EP had sold 40,000 copies.

== Track listing ==
All tracks are written by Joakim Berg.

The hjärta & smärta EP track listing
| No. | Title | Length |
|---|---|---|
| 1. | "Vi mot världen" (We Against the World) | 4:12 |
| 2. | "Dom som försvann" (Those Who Disappeared) | 4:55 |
| 3. | "Ansgar & Evelyne" | 4:16 |
| 4. | "Flen/Paris" | 3:44 |
| 5. | "Månadens erbjudande" (Offer of the Month) | 4:12 |

== Personnel ==
Credits adapted from the liner notes of The hjärta & smärta EP.

Kent

- Joakim Berg – music, lyrics, vocals, guitar
- Martin Sköld – bass, keyboards
- Sami Sirviö – guitar, keyboards
- Markus Mustonen – drums, backing vocals, keyboards, piano
- Harri Mänty – rhythm guitar, percussion

Additional musicians

- Nille Perned – guitar, synthesizer on track 2
- Amelie Reuterskiöld, Axel Bergström, David Johnson, Frederik Magnusson, Frida Sandén, Jonathan Lavotha, Ludwig Schreiter, Maja Lundmark, Mimmi Sandén, Molly Sandén – choir on track 2
- Pelle Olofson – choir leader on track 2

Technical

- Kent – producer
- Nille Perned – producer
- Stefan Boman – producer
- Martin Brengesjö – instrument technician
- Tim Young – mastering

Artwork

- Jonas Linell – photography

== Charts ==
=== Weekly charts ===
Weekly chart performance for The hjärta & smärta EP
| Chart (2005–2006) | Peak position |
|---|---|
| Denmark (Tracklisten) | 2 |
| Finland (Suomen virallinen lista) | 1 |
| Norway (VG-lista) | 2 |
| Sweden (Sverigetopplistan) | 1 |

=== Year-end charts ===
Year-end chart performance for The hjärta & smärta EP
| Chart (2005) | Position |
|---|---|
| Sweden (Sverigetopplistan) | 2 |
| Chart (2006) | Position |
| Sweden (Sverigetopplistan) | 40 |
