= Egoist (Kent song) =

2016 single by Kent

Single by Kent
- Released: 14 March 2016
- Recorded: Electric Lady Studios, (New York City, United States); Hamsterdam Studios, (Stockholm, Sweden)
- Genre: Alternative rock
- Length: 4:05
- Label: RCA, Sony Music
- Songwriter: Joakim Berg
- Producer: Kent

Kent singles chronology
"Var är vi nu?" (2014)	"Egoist" (2016)	"Vi är inte längre där" (2016)

"Egoist" is a song by Swedish alternative rock band Kent. It was announced as the first single from the album Då som nu för alltid, however, on 17 April 2016 Kent announced the track listing which omitted "Egoist".

== Critical reception ==
Anders Nunstedt at Expressen wrote: "Egoist is not Kent's best single, but it already feels like a given on the Greatest hits album the band plans to release this autumn – ahead of their very last arena tour. It is also a welcome confirmation that the dissolution of the band is not based on the fact that they have nothing left to give."

Håkan Steen at Aftonbladet described the song as "a dark fight song" and thought that "it sounds like a hit."

== Track listing ==
- Digital download and 7" vinyl single
1. "Egoist" – 4:05

== Charts ==
=== Weekly charts ===
Weekly chart performance for "Egoist"
Chart (2016)	Peak position
Sweden (Sverigetopplistan)	4

=== Year-end charts ===
Year-end chart performance for "Egoist"
Chart (2016)	Position
Sweden (Sverigetopplistan)	87
