= Kent (album) =

Studio album by Kent
- Released: 15 March 1995
- Recorded: 6–16 October 1994
- Studio: Silence, Koppom
- Genre: Indie rock
- Length: 38:47
- Label: BMG
- Producer: Nille Perned

Kent chronology
| Kent (1995) | Verkligen (1996) |

Singles from kent
- 1. "När det blåser på månen" Released: 6 February 1995; 2. "Som vatten" Released: 27 March 1995; 3. "Frank" Released: 29 May 1995; 4. "Jag vill inte vara rädd" Released: 18 September 1995

Professional ratings
Review scores
| Source | Rating |
|---|---|
| Expressen | 3/5 stars |

Kent is the debut studio album by Swedish alternative rock band Kent, released on 15 March 1995. In March 2020, a vinyl reissue was released to commemorate the 25th anniversary of the album.

== Background and recording ==
On 9 June 1994, Kent was the opening act for the Cardigans. On 26 June, Kent were offered a record contract with the Swedish division of RCA/BMG by Per Lindholm. The band signed the contract on the same day. The album was recorded in ten hectic days between 6 and 16 October 1994 at Silence Studio in Koppom, Värmland.

== Track listing ==
All lyrics are written by Joakim Berg.

| No. | Title | Music | Length |
|---|---|---|---|
| 1. | "Blåjeans" (Blue Jeans) | Joakim Berg | 2:58 |
| 2. | "Som vatten" (Like Water) | Berg | 2:54 |
| 3. | "Ingenting någonsin" (Nothing Ever) | Berg | 4:02 |
| 4. | "När det blåser på månen" (When the Wind Blows on the Moon) | Martin Sköld | 4:19 |
| 5. | "Jag vill inte vara rädd" (I Don't Want to be Afraid) | Berg | 3:34 |
| 6. | "Vad två öron klarar" (What Two Ears Can Take) | Berg | 3:47 |
| 7. | "Den osynlige mannen" (The Invisible Man) | Berg | 2:44 |
| 8. | "Pojken med hålet i handen" (The Boy With the Hole in His Hand) | Sköld | 2:09 |
| 9. | "Ingen kommer att tro dig" (No One Will Believe You) | Berg | 3:31 |
| 10. | "Stenbrott" (Quarry) | Berg | 4:21 |
| 11. | "Frank" | Berg | 4:48 |

== Personnel ==
Credits adapted from the liner notes of Kent.

Kent

- Joakim Berg – music, lyrics, vocals
- Martin Sköld – music on track 4, 8, bass
- Sami Sirviö – guitar
- Markus Mustonen – drums, backing vocals
- Martin Roos – guitar

Technical

- Nille Perned – producer, mixing, mastering
- Zmago Smon (Zed) – mixing
- Peter Dahl – mastering

Artwork

- Jonas Linell – photography
- Martin Högström – design

== Charts ==
=== Weekly charts ===
1996 chart performance for kent
| Chart (1996) | Peak position |
|---|---|
| Swedish Albums (Sverigetopplistan) | 22 |

2020 chart performance for kent
| Chart (2020) | Peak position |
|---|---|
| Swedish Albums (Sverigetopplistan) | 2 |
