= Isola (album) =

1997 studio album by the Swedish band, Kent

Studio album by Kent
- Released: 12 November 1997 (Swedish version); 27 April 1998 (English version)
- Studio: Galaxy Studios (Mol); Ljudhavet (Stockholm); Europa Studios (Stockholm)
- Genre: Alternative rock
- Length: 49:46 (Swedish version); 53:48 (English version)
- Label: BMG
- Producer: Zed

Kent chronology
Verkligen (1996)	Isola (1997)	Hagnesta Hill (1999)

Singles from Isola
- 1. "Om du var här" Released: 6 October 1997; 2. "Saker man ser" Released: 26 January 1998; 3. "747" Released: 13 July 1998

Professional ratings
Review scores
Source	Rating
Aftonbladet	5/5 stars
Expressen	4/5 stars
Göteborgs-Posten	4/5 stars

Isola is the third studio album by Swedish alternative rock band Kent. It was released on 12 November 1997. It was followed by an English version in 1998, for which a new song, "Velvet", was recorded.

The last song on the album, "747", became a fan favourite and was used as concert closer between 1997 and 2003.

Isola won the Album of the Year award at the Swedish Grammy Awards in 1998.

== Track listing ==
All lyrics are written by Joakim Berg.

Isola Swedish version track listing
No.	Title	Music	Length
1.	"Livräddaren"	Joakim Berg, Martin Sköld	4:36
2.	"Om du var här"	Berg	4:00
3.	"Saker man ser"	Berg	3:53
4.	"Oprofessionell"	Berg	4:45
5.	"OWC"	Berg	3:08
6.	"Celsius"	Berg	4:15
7.	"Bianca"	Berg, Sköld	4:55
8.	"Innan allting tar slut"	Berg	3:40
9.	"Elvis"	Berg	4:33
10.	"Glider"	Berg	4:04
11.	"747"	Berg	7:47

* "OWC" stands for Off World Colonies, a reference to the film Blade Runner. The song's opening piano line was also inspired by the film's soundtrack, which was composed by Vangelis.

All lyrics are written by Joakim Berg and Chris Gordon.

Isola English version track listing
No.	Title	Music	Length
1.	"Lifesavers"	Joakim Berg, Martin Sköld	4:36
2.	"If You Were Here"	Berg	4:01
3.	"Things She Said"	Berg	3:55
4.	"Unprofessional"	Berg	4:45
5.	"OWC"	Berg	3:10
6.	"Celsius"	Berg	4:16
7.	"Bianca"	Berg, Sköld	4:56
8.	"Before It All Ends"	Berg	3:40
9.	"Elvis"	Berg	4:33
10.	"Velvet"	Berg	4:06
11.	"Glider"	Berg	4:05
12.	"747"	Berg	7:48

== Personnel ==
Credits adapted from the liner notes of Isola.

Kent

- Joakim Berg – music, lyrics, vocals, guitar
- Martin Sköld – music on track 1, 7, bass, keyboards
- Sami Sirviö – guitar, keyboards, 6-string bass
- Markus Mustonen – drums, backing vocals, keyboards, piano
- Harri Mänty – rhythm guitar, percussion, drum machine

Additional musicians

- Joakim Milder – arranged by (strings), conductor
- Henrik Söderquist – cello
- Ulrika Gardelin – viola
- Klara Hellgren – violin
- David Björkman – violin

Technical

- Zmago Smon (Zed) – producer, mixing, recording
- Martin von Schmalensee – technician
- Koen De Boevé – technician
- Tim Young – mastering

Artwork

- Jonas Linell – photography
- Peter Gehrke – photography

== Charts ==
=== Weekly charts ===
Weekly chart performance for Swedish version of Isola
Chart (1997–1998)	Peak position
Finnish Albums (Suomen virallinen lista)	12
Norwegian Albums (VG-lista)	35
Swedish Albums (Sverigetopplistan)	1
Chart (2025)	Position
Greek Albums (IFPI)	47

Weekly chart performance for English version of Isola
Chart (1998)	Peak position
Dutch Albums (Album Top 100)	93
Swedish Albums (Sverigetopplistan)	59
Chart (2023)	Position
Swedish Albums (Sverigetopplistan)	20

=== Year-end charts ===
Year-end chart performance for Swedish version of Isola
Chart (1997)	Position
Swedish Albums (Sverigetopplistan)	33
Chart (1998)	Position
Swedish Albums (Sverigetopplistan)	89
