= La Belle Epoque (song) =

2014 single by Kent

Single by Kent

from the album Tigerdrottningen
- Released: 12 March 2014
- Studio: Conway (Los Angeles)
- Genre: Alternative rock
- Length: 3:57
- Label: Sonet, Universal
- Songwriter: Joakim Berg
- Producers: Kent, Daniel Alexander

Kent singles chronology
"Tänd på" (2012)	"La Belle Epoque" (2014)	"Var är vi nu?" (2014)

"La Belle Epoque" is a song by Swedish alternative rock band Kent from their eleventh studio album, Tigerdrottningen. It was released as the album's lead single on 12 March 2014, as a digital download. It features backing vocals by singer Erik Hassle.

In an interview with Gaffa, lead singer Joakim Berg explained the song's lyrics saying, "We have become a Belle Epoque-nation pointing fingers at each other, it's your fault, it's your fault". Berg further elaborated, "A friend of mine who is a political journalist says that we have become a nation of political separatists. A bunch of small groups that are all extremely offended and do not show any understanding for each other, no one wants to reconcile, nobody wants to negotiate and no one wants to compromise.

== Track listing ==
- Digital download
1. "La Belle Epoque" – 3:57
- 7" vinyl single
1. "La Belle Epoque" – 3:58
2. "La Belle Epoque" (instrumental) – 3:58

== Credits and personnel ==
Recording

- Recorded at Conway Studios, Los Angeles, United States
- Mixed at Park Studios, Stockholm, Sweden
- Mastered at Sterling Sound, New York City, United States

Personnel

- Joakim Berg – songwriter
- Kent – producer
- Daniel Alexander – producer
- Stefan Boman – recording, mixer
- Ryan Smith – mastering
- Erik Hassle – backing vocals

Credits adapted from "La Belle Epoque" 7" vinyl liner notes.

== Charts ==
=== Weekly charts ===
Weekly chart performance for "La Belle Epoque"
Chart (2014)	Peak position
Sweden (Sverigetopplistan)	8

=== Year-end charts ===
Year-end chart performance for "La Belle Epoque"
Chart (2014)	Position
Sweden (Sverigetopplistan)	71

== Certifications ==
Region	Certification	Certified units/sales
Sweden (GLF)	Gold	20,000^{‡}
^{‡} Sales+streaming figures based on certification alone.
