= Verkligen =

1996 album by Kent

Studio album by Kent
- Released: 15 March 1996
- Studio: Music A Matic (Gothenburg); Orinoco (London)
- Genre: Alternative rock
- Length: 43:05
- Label: BMG
- Producer: Nille Perned

Kent chronology
Kent (1995)	Verkligen (1996)	Isola (1997)

Singles from Verkligen
- 1. "Kräm (så nära får ingen gå)" Released: 9 February 1996; 2. "Halka" Released: 29 April 1996; 3. "Gravitation" Released: 23 September 1996

Professional ratings
Review scores
Source	Rating
Aftonbladet	5/5 stars
Dagens Skiva	5/10

Verkligen (Swedish for Really) is the second studio album by Swedish alternative rock band Kent. It was released on 15 March 1996, exactly one year after their self-titled debut album.

== Track listing ==
All lyrics are written by Joakim Berg.

No.	Title	Music	Length
1.	"Avtryck" (Imprint)	Joakim Berg	3:11
2.	"Kräm (så nära får ingen gå)" (Cream (No One Is Allowed That Close))	Berg, Martin Sköld	2:42
3.	"Gravitation" (Gravity)	Berg	3:44
4.	"Istället för ljud" (Instead of Sound)	Berg, Sköld	4:22
5.	"10 minuter (för mig själv)" (10 minutes (For Myself))	Berg	3:10
6.	"En timme en minut" (One Hour One Minute)	Berg	8:08
7.	"Indianer" (Indians)	Berg	3:47
8.	"Halka" (Slipperiness)	Berg	3:03
9.	"Thinner" (Thinner)	Sköld	3:59
10.	"Vi kan väl vänta tills imorgon" (Can't We Wait Until Tomorrow)	Berg	6:55

== Personnel ==
Credits adapted from the liner notes of Verkligen.

Kent

- Joakim Berg – music, lyrics, vocals, guitar
- Martin Sköld – music on track 2, 4, 9, bass
- Sami Sirviö – guitar
- Markus Mustonen – drums, backing vocals

Technical

- Nille Perned – producer, mixing, recording
- Zmago Smon (Zed) – mixing, recording
- Peter Dahl – mastering

== Charts ==
"Kräm (så nära får ingen gå)" (1996)
Sample of track 2, "Kräm (så nära får ingen gå)".

=== Weekly charts ===
Weekly chart performance for Verkligen
Chart (1996)	Peak position
Swedish Albums (Sverigetopplistan)	1
Chart (2025)	Position
Greek Albums (IFPI)	97
