= Kräm (så nära får ingen gå) =

1996 single by Kent

Single by Kent

from the album Verkligen
- B-side: "Rödljus"; "En helt ny karriär"
- Released: 9 February 1996
- Genre: Alternative rock
- Length: 2:42
- Label: RCA Victor, BMG
- Songwriter(s): Joakim Berg, Martin Sköld
- Producer(s): Nille Perned

Kent singles chronology
"Jag vill inte vara rädd" (1995)	"Kräm (så nära får ingen gå)" (1996)	"Halka" (1996)

Music video
- "Kräm (så nära får ingen gå)" on YouTube

"Kräm (så nära får ingen gå)" is a song by Swedish alternative rock band Kent. It was released on 9 February 1996 as the lead single from their second studio album, Verkligen. The CD single contains the B-sides, "Rödljus" and "En helt ny karriär". These two tracks were recorded, produced and mixed by Kent and Heikki Kiviaho, and were later released on the compilation B-sidor 95–00 in 2000.

The song peaked at number four in Sweden, becoming the band's first single to chart.

== Track listing ==
All lyrics are written by Joakim Berg.

No.	Title	Music	Length
1.	"Kräm (så nära får ingen gå)" (Cream (No One Is Allowed That Close))	Joakim Berg, Martin Sköld	2:42
2.	"Rödljus" (Red Lights)	Berg	3:41
3.	"En helt ny karriär" (A Brand New Career)	Berg	4:09

== Charts ==
=== Weekly charts ===
Weekly chart performance for "Kräm (så nära får ingen gå)"
Chart (1996)	Peak position
Sweden (Sverigetopplistan)	4

=== Year-end charts ===
Year-end chart performance for "Kräm (så nära får ingen gå)"
Chart (1996)	Position
Sweden (Yopplistan)	70
