= Dom som försvann =

Song by Kent

from the EP The hjärta & smärta EP
- Released: 28 October 2005 (digital); 2 November 2005 (physical)
- Studio: Park Studio (Stockholm)
- Genre: Alternative rock
- Length: 4:55
- Songwriter(s): Joakim Berg
- Producer(s): Kent, Nille Perned, Stefan Boman

Music video
- "Dom som försvann" on YouTube

"Dom som försvann" (translation: Those who disappeared) is a song by Swedish alternative rock band Kent that was released on The hjärta & smärta EP in 2005.

In Norway the song entered the official single chart on week 9 in 2006. Previously it was credited on the chart under the EP, but during four weeks in 2006 "Dom som försvann" was given an entry on the chart. The song was also on Svensktoppen for one week, on 15 January 2006 at 10th place.

== Music video ==
The music video for "Dom som försvann" was directed by Adam Berg, the brother of Joakim Berg. The video features some children with some strange special effects. It won the 2006 Swedish Grammy Awards in the "Music video of the year" category.

== Charts ==
=== Weekly charts ===
Weekly chart performance for "Dom som försvann"
Chart (2006)	Peak position
Norway (VG-lista)	8
