= P3 Gold Awards =

Swedish music awards

- Awarded for: Popular music in Sweden
- Country: Sweden
- Presented by: Sveriges Radio P3
- First award: 2003
- Website: sverigesradio.se/p3guld

Television/radio coverage
- Network: Sveriges Radio and Sveriges Television
- Related: P3 Guld (Denmark); P3 Gull (Norway)

The P3 Gold Awards (Swedish: P3 Guld) are annual music awards recognising contributions to Swedish popular music, presented by Sveriges Radio's P3 channel. First presented in 2003 in Växjö, nominees are selected by a jury and winners are determined by a public vote. Subsequent ceremonies have been held in Gothenburg for the most part, though Partille and Stockholm have also hosted a handful of times.

The ceremony is generally held in January and aims to showcase performances from current Swedish artists. During the COVID-19 pandemic in Sweden, there was no ceremony held in 2022.

== Categories ==
As of the 2024 ceremony, there are eight award categories. All categories have five nominees, with the exception of Artist of the Future, which has eight nominees, and the P3 Icon award, whose recipient is selected by the year's jury.

Categories of the P3 Gold Awards
Category	First awarded	Basis	Latest recipient(s) (2025)
Artist of the Year (Årets artist)	2003	artist's work produced during the nomination period	Benjamin Ingrosso
Group of the Year (Årets grupp)	2003	group's work produced during the nomination period	Swedish House Mafia
Song of the Year (Årets låt)	2003	song with a large impact during the nomination period	"Kite" by Benjamin Ingrosso
Song Quote of the Year (Årets låtcitat)	2024	song lyric (in any language) that makes a strong impression	"Alltid på väg någon annanstans / En flyttfågel ur balans" from "Regnblöta skor" by Miriam Bryant
Album of the Year (Årets album)	2023	release during the nomination period consisting of at least five tracks (compilation albums and live albums are not eligible)	Pink Velvet Theatre by Benjamin Ingrosso
Artist of the Future (Framtidens artist)	2018	artist believed to be headed for a breakthrough in the near future	Orkid
Golden Mic (Guldmicken)	2003	live performances during the nomination period	Benjamin Ingrosso
P3 Icon (P3 Ikon)	2023	artist with "iconic" and influential status in Swedish music, whose career spans at least a decade and continues to be relevant	Håkan Hellström

Awards were previously handed out in the following categories:

- Pop of the Year
- Hip Hop/R&B of the Year (previously Hip Hop/Soul of the Year)
- Rock/Metal of the Year
- Dance of the Year
- Newcomer of the Year

== See also ==
- P3 Gull – a similar music award in Norway
