= Gravitation (song) =

1999 single by Kent

Single by Kent

from the album Verkligen
- Released: 23 September 1996
- Genre: Alternative rock
- Label: RCA Victor, BMG
- Songwriter(s): Joakim Berg
- Producer(s): Nille Perned

Kent singles chronology
"Halka" (1996)	"Gravitation" (1996)	"Om du var här" (1997)

Music video
- "Gravitation" on YouTube

"Gravitation" is a song by Swedish alternative rock band Kent. It was released in September 1996 as the third single from the album Verkligen. It includes the two b-sides, "Verkligen" and "Livrädd med stil", which were produced and recorded by Kent and Heikki Kiviaho.

The music video of the song won the 1997 Swedish Grammy Awards in the "Music video of the year" category.

== Track listing ==
All lyrics are written by Joakim Berg.

CD single
No.	Title	Music	Length
1.	"Gravitation" (Gravity)	Joakim Berg	3:44
2.	"Verkligen" (Really)	Kent	5:31
3.	"Livrädd med stil" (Terrified with Style)	Berg	2:50

== Charts ==
=== Weekly charts ===
Weekly chart performance for "Gravitation"
Chart (1996)	Peak position
Sweden (Sverigetopplistan)	14
