= Om du var här =

1997 song by Kent

Single by Kent

from the album Isola
- B-side: "På nära håll" "Utan dina andetag"
- Released: 6 October 1997 (Swedish version); 16 February 1998 (English version)
- Genre: Alternative rock
- Label: BMG Sweden/RCA Victor
- Songwriter: Joakim Berg
- Producer: Zed

Kent singles chronology
"Gravitation" (1996)	"Om du var här" (1997)	"Saker man ser" (1998)

Music video
- "Om du var här" on YouTube

"Om du var här" (Swedish for If You Were Here) is a song by Swedish alternative rock band Kent. It was released in October 1997 as the first single from the album Isola. A version in English was also released under the title "If You Were Here".

It contains three b-sides that is not on the album; "På nära håll", "Utan dina andetag" and a remix of "Om du var här" called Unload/Reload remix made by the Swedish jazz/electro pop group Koop. By 2016, "Utan dina andetag" would become Kent's most-streamed song on Spotify.

The cover of this single can vary. The Maxi single has an aircraft taking off in the background as opposed to the two track single where the aircraft has been edited out.

On 8 October 1998, the band performed the English version "If You Were Here" on the French TV talk show Nulle part ailleurs.

In 2025, "If You Were Here" was covered by the Swedish melodic death metal band The Halo Effect.

== Track listing ==
All lyrics are written by Joakim Berg.

CD maxi track listing
No.	Title	Music	Length
1.	"Om du var här" (If You Were Here)	Joakim Berg	4:00
2.	"På nära håll" (Close at Hand)	Berg	3:19
3.	"Utan dina andetag" (Without Your Breath)	Berg	4:23
4.	"Om du var här" (Unload/Reload remix)	Berg	3:55

Cardboard sleeve CD track listing
No.	Title	Length
1.	"Om du var här"	4:00
2.	"På nära håll"	3:19

English version CD single track listing
No.	Title	Music	Length
1.	"If You Were Here"	Berg	3:59
2.	"Point Blank"	Berg	3:19
3.	"The One to Blame"	Berg	4:30

== Charts ==
=== Weekly charts ===
Weekly chart performance for "Om du var här"
Chart (1997–1998)	Peak position
Sweden (Sverigetopplistan)	3

Weekly chart performance for "If You Were Here"
Chart (1998)	Peak position
Netherlands (Dutch Single Top 100)	90

=== Year-end charts ===
Year-end chart performance for "Om du var här"
Chart (1997)	Position
Sweden (Sverigetopplistan)	31
