= Markus Mustonen =

Swedish musician

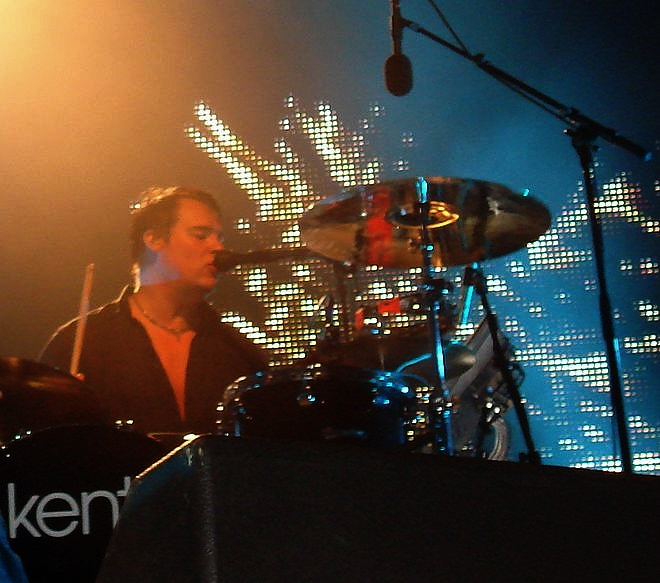

Background information
- Born: Markus Mikael Randolph Mustonen; 20 January 1973 (age 53); Torshälla, Sweden
- Genres: Rock; synth; pop
- Occupation: Musician
- Instruments: Drums; keyboards; piano; backing vocals
- Years active: 1990–present
- Formerly of: Kent

Markus Mikael Randolph Mustonen (born 20 January 1973) is a Sweden Finnish musician who played drums, keyboards and piano in the Swedish alternative rock band Kent.
