= Martin Sköld =

Swedish musician (born 1970)

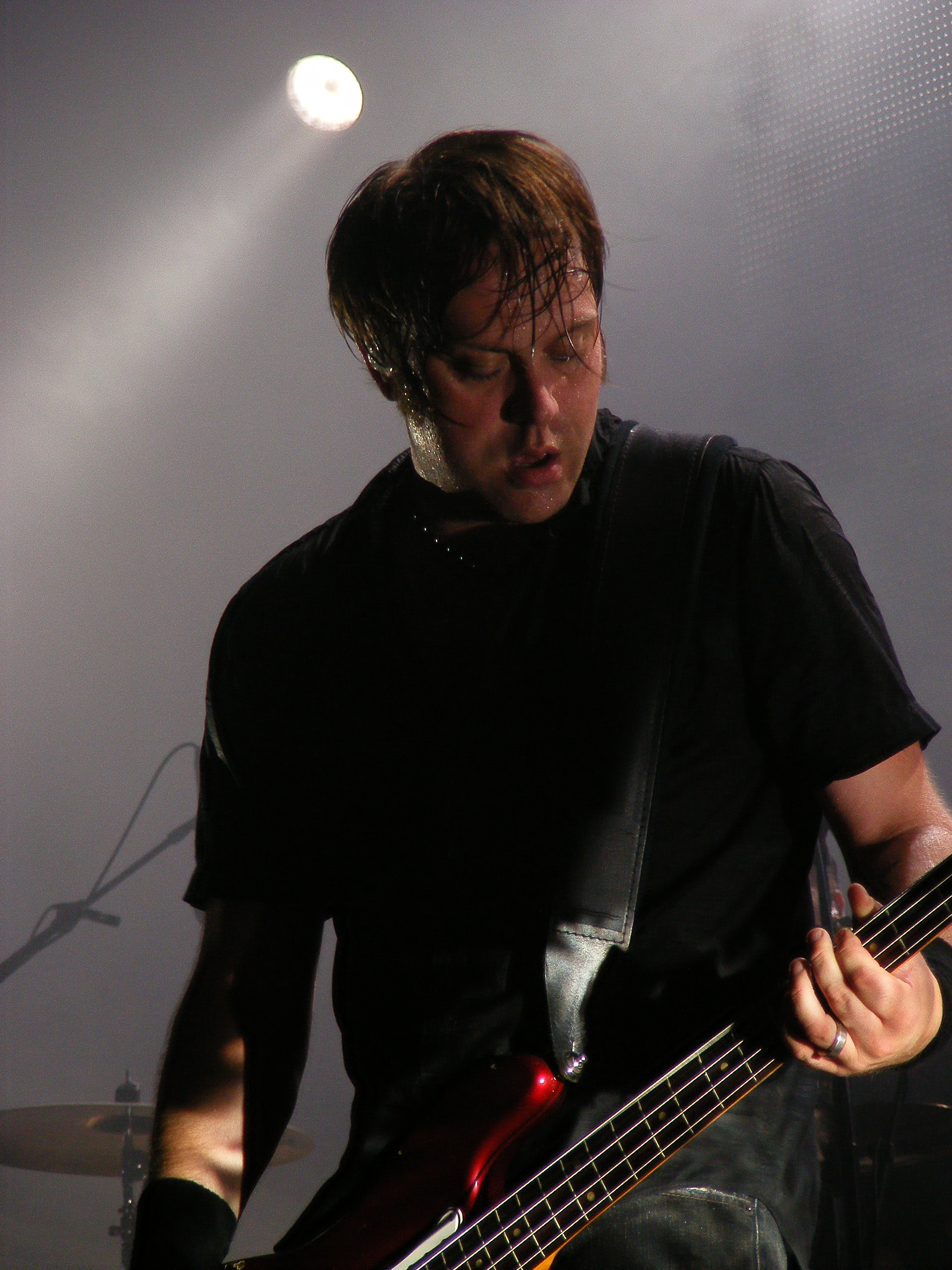

Background information
- Origin: Sparreholm, Sweden
- Genres: Synth, Pop, Rock
- Instruments: Bass guitar, keyboards
- Years active: 1990–present
- Formerly of: Kent
- Website: kent.nu

Martin Sköld (born 2 October 1970 in Sparreholm, Södermanland) is a Swedish musician who played bass and keyboards in the Swedish alternative rock band Kent. Alongside lead singer Joakim Berg he was responsible for writing the band's music.

== See also ==
- Music of Sweden
