= Kent discography =

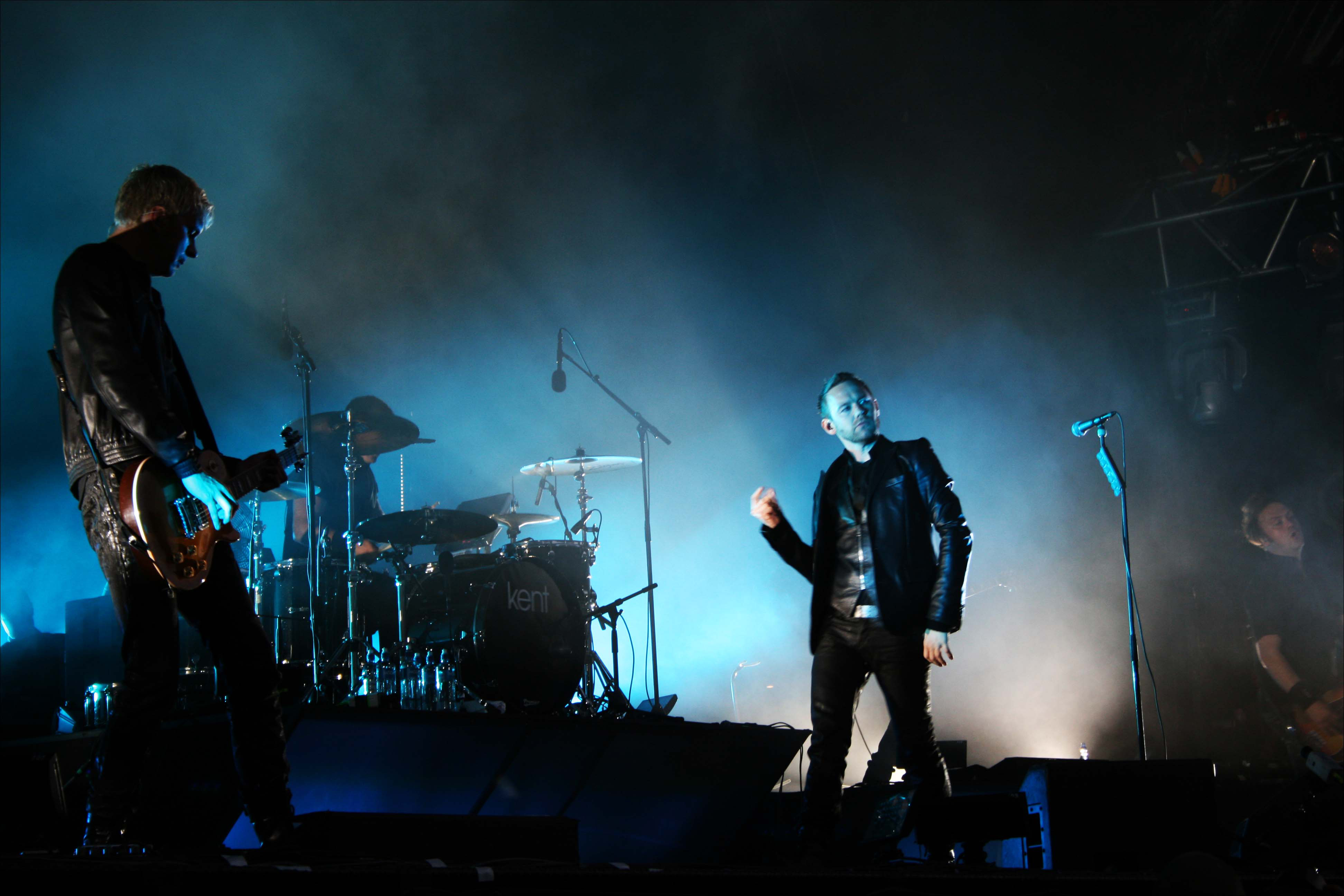
- Kent performing in July 2008
- Studio albums: 12
- Extended plays: 1
- Compilation albums: 3
- Music videos: 34
- Singles in Swedish: 40
- Singles in English: 5

The discography of the Swedish alternative rock band Kent consists of twelve studio albums (with two of them also released in English), three compilation albums, one of whom is a box set, one EP, forty Swedish and five English singles. The band was founded by Joakim Berg (lead vocals and guitar), Martin Sköld (bass and keyboards), Sami Sirviö (lead guitar) and Markus Mustonen (drums, backing vocals) in Eskilstuna in 1990.

With eleven number-one albums, five number-one singles, 22 Swedish Grammy Awards, and over three million record sales, Kent is considered the most popular rock/pop group within Sweden and throughout Scandinavia. Vapen & ammunition (2002) topped the Swedish charts for eight weeks.

As Kent's songs are primarily performed in Swedish, they are unfamiliar to most English-speaking audiences. Kent briefly attempted an international career with English versions of the albums Isola (1997) and Hagnesta Hill (1999) and an accompanying American tour for the former, but stopped after finding less success than they had in Scandinavia.

== Albums ==
=== Swedish studio albums ===
Title	Album details	Peak chart positions					Sales	Certifications
Title	Album details	SWE	NOR	FIN	DEN	KOR	Sales	Certifications
Kent	Released: 15 March 1995; Label: RCA, BMG; Format: CD	22	—	—	—	—	Worldwide: 60,000	SWE: Gold
Verkligen	Released: 15 March 1996; Label: RCA Victor, BMG; Format: LP, CD, cassette	1	—	—	—	—	Worldwide: 120,000	SWE: Platinum
Isola	Released: 12 November 1997; Label: RCA Victor, BMG; Format: LP, CD, cassette	1	35	12	—	—	Worldwide: 240,000	SWE: 2× Platinum; FIN: Gold; NOR: Gold
Hagnesta Hill	Released: 6 December 1999; Label: RCA Victor, BMG; Format: LP, CD, cassette	1	9	6	—	—	Worldwide: 250,000	SWE: 2× Platinum; FIN: Gold
Vapen & ammunition	Released: 15 April 2002; Label: RCA, BMG; Format: LP, CD	1	1	1	4	—	Worldwide: 600,000	SWE: 6× Platinum; FIN: Platinum; DEN: 2× Platinum; NOR: 2× Platinum
Du & jag döden	Released: 15 March 2005; Label: RCA, Sony BMG; Format: LP, CD	1	1	2	2	—	Worldwide: 220,000	SWE: 2× Platinum; FIN: Gold
Tillbaka till samtiden	Released: 17 October 2007; Label: RCA, Sony BMG; Format: LP, CD, digital download	1	2	3	5	—		SWE: 3× Platinum
Röd	Released: 6 November 2009; Label: RCA, Sony; Format: LP, CD, digital download	1	4	4	6	—		SWE: 2× Platinum
En plats i solen	Released: 30 June 2010; Label: RCA; Format: LP, CD, digital download	1	2	1	4	—		SWE: Platinum; FIN: Gold
Jag är inte rädd för mörkret	Released: 25 April 2012; Label: Sonet, Universal; Format: LP, CD, digital download	1	1	5	2	—		SWE: Platinum
Tigerdrottningen	Released: 30 April 2014; Label: Sonet, Universal; Format: LP, CD, digital download	1	1	6	3	—		SWE: Platinum
Då som nu för alltid	Released: 20 May 2016; Label: RCA, Sony; Format: CD, digital download	1	5	3	13	61		SWE: 2× Platinum
"—" denotes items which were not released in that country or failed to chart.

=== English studio albums ===
Title	Album details	Peak chart positions	
Title	Album details	SWE	NLD
Isola	Released: 27 April 1998; Label: RCA Victor, BMG; Format: CD	20	93
Hagnesta Hill	Released: 28 April 2000; Label: RCA Victor, BMG; Format: CD	19	—
"—" denotes items which were not released in that country or failed to chart.

=== Compilation albums ===
Title	Album details	Peak chart positions			Sales	Certifications (sales thresholds)
Title	Album details	SWE	NOR	FIN	Sales	Certifications (sales thresholds)
B-sidor 95–00	Released: 29 November 2000; Label: RCA Victor, BMG; Format: CD	2	31	18	Worldwide: 60,000	SWE: Platinum
Best Of	Released: 16 September 2016; Label: RCA, Sony Music; Format: LP, CD	1	16	9		

=== Box sets ===
Title	Album details	Peak chart positions			Certifications (sales thresholds)
Title	Album details	SWE	NOR	FIN	Certifications (sales thresholds)
Box 1991–2008	Released: 29 October 2008; Label: Sony BMG; Format: CD	1	38	18	SWE: Platinum

== Extended plays ==
=== EPs ===
Title	Details	Peak chart positions				Certifications (sales thresholds)
Title	Details	SWE	NOR	FIN	DEN	Certifications (sales thresholds)
The hjärta & smärta EP	Released: 2 November 2005; Label: RCA, Sony BMG; Format: CD	1	2	1	2	SWE: 2× Platinum

== Singles ==
=== Swedish ===
Year	Single	Peak chart positions				Certifications	Album
Year	Single	SWE	NOR	FIN	DEN	Certifications	Album
1995	"När det blåser på månen"	—	—	—	—		Kent
1995	"Som vatten"	—	—	—	—		Kent
1995	"Frank"	—	—	—	—		Kent
1995	"Jag vill inte vara rädd"	—	—	—	—		Kent
1996	"Kräm (så nära får ingen gå)"	4	—	—	—		Verkligen
1996	"Halka"	36	—	—	—		Verkligen
1996	"Gravitation"	14	—	—	—		Verkligen
1997	"Om du var här"	3	—	—	—	SWE: Gold	Isola
1998	"Saker man ser"	22	—	—	—		Isola
1998	"747"	28	—	—	—		Isola
1999	"Musik non stop"	3	14	9	—		Hagnesta Hill
2000	"En himmelsk drog"	12	—	11	—		Hagnesta Hill
2000	"Kevlarsjäl"	23	—	—	—		Hagnesta Hill
2000	"Chans"	14	—	—	—		B-sidor 95–00
2000	"Spökstad"^{[C]}	—	—	—	—		B-sidor 95–00
2002	"Dom andra"	1	8	5	—	SWE: Platinum	Vapen & Ammunition
2002	"Kärleken väntar"	2	19	16	—		Vapen & Ammunition
2002	"FF" / "VinterNoll2"	2	9	10	—	SWE: Gold	Vapen & Ammunition
2005	"Max 500"	1	1	4	6	SWE: Platinum	Du & jag döden
2005	"Palace & Main"	1	—	5	—		Du & jag döden
2005	"Den döda vinkeln"	14	—	—	—		Du & jag döden
2006	"Nålens öga"	3	—	—	—	SWE: Gold	non-album single
2007	"Ingenting"	2	2	17	11	SWE: Gold	Tillbaka till samtiden
2007	"Columbus"	3	—	—	—		Tillbaka till samtiden
2008	"Generation Ex"	9	—	—	—		Tillbaka till samtiden
2008	"Vy från ett luftslott"	31	—	—	—		Tillbaka till samtiden
2009	"Töntarna"	1	1	5	—	SWE: Gold	Röd
2009	"2000"^{[D]}	1	—	—	—		non-album single
2009	"Hjärta"	30	—	—	—		Röd
2010	"Idioter"	33	—	—	—		Röd
2010	"Gamla Ullevi"	1	—	—	—		En plats i solen
2010	"Skisser för sommaren"	2	—	—	—		En plats i solen
2010	"Ismael" / "Varje gång du möter min blick"	13	—	—	—		En plats i solen
2012	"999"	10	—	—	—		Jag är inte rädd för mörkret
2012	"Jag ser dig"	33	—	—	—		Jag är inte rädd för mörkret
2012	"Tänd på"	37	—	—	—		Jag är inte rädd för mörkret
2012	"Ingen kunde röra oss"	—	—	—	—		non-album single
2014	"La Belle Epoque"	8	—	—	—	SWE: Gold	Tigerdrottningen
2014	"Var är vi nu?"	21	—	—	—		Tigerdrottningen
2014	"Mirage"	18	—	—	—		Tigerdrottningen
2016	"Egoist"	4	—	—	—		Best Of
2016	"Vi är inte längre där"	22	—	—	—		Då som nu för alltid
"—" denotes items which were not released in that country or failed to chart.

=== English ===
Year	Single	Peak chart positions		Album
Year	Single	NLD	UK	Album
1998	"If You Were Here"	90	158	Isola
1998	"Things She Said"	—	—	Isola
1999	"747"	—	61	Isola
1999	"If You Were Here" (reissue)	—	—	Isola
2000	"Music Non Stop"	—	—	Hagnesta Hill
2000	"Heavenly Junkies"	—	—	Hagnesta Hill
"—" denotes items which were not released in that country or failed to chart.

== Other charted songs ==
Year	Song	Peak chart positions		Album
Year	Song	SWE	NOR	Album
2005	"Dom som försvann"	—	8	The hjärta & smärta EP
2007	"Min värld"	36	—	non-album single
2007	"Tick Tack"	56	—	non-album single
2008	"Det kanske kommer en förändring"	18	—	non-album single
2008	"Berlin"	39	—	Tillbaka till samtiden
2010	"Sverige"	46	—	Vapen & ammunition
2010	"Utan dina andetag"	48	—	B-sidor 95–00
2012	"Petroleum"	28	—	Jag är inte rädd för mörkret
2012	"Isis & bast"	33	—	Jag är inte rädd för mörkret
2012	"Beredd på allt"	48	—	Jag är inte rädd för mörkret
2012	"Ruta 1"	57	—	Jag är inte rädd för mörkret
2012	"Färger på natten"	53	—	Jag är inte rädd för mörkret
2012	"Låt dom komma"	60	—	Jag är inte rädd för mörkret
2014	"Skogarna"	12	—	Tigerdrottningen
2014	"Svart snö"	24	—	Tigerdrottningen
2014	"Allt har sin tid"	31	—	Tigerdrottningen
2014	"Innan himlen faller ner"	28	—	Tigerdrottningen
2014	"Din enda vän"	25	—	Tigerdrottningen
2014	"Godhet"	26	—	Tigerdrottningen
2014	"Simmaren"	42	—	Tigerdrottningen
2014	"Den andra sidan"	39	—	Tigerdrottningen
2016	"Andromeda"	21	—	Då som nu för alltid
2016	"Tennsoldater"	27	—	Då som nu för alltid
2016	"Vi är för alltid"	28	—	Då som nu för alltid
2016	"Nattpojken & Dagflickan"	32	—	Då som nu för alltid
2016	"Förlåtelsen"	41	—	Då som nu för alltid
2016	"Den sista sången"	42	—	Då som nu för alltid
2016	"Gigi"	46	—	Då som nu för alltid
2016	"Skyll inte ifrån dig"	49	—	Då som nu för alltid
2016	"Falska profeter"	52	—	Då som nu för alltid
2016	"Terapi"	60	—	Best Of
2016	"Silver"	91	—	Best Of
2024	"Pärlor"	16	—	Vapen & ammunition
2025	"Utan dina andetag"	11	—	B-sidor 95–00
2025	"Sundance Kid"	— (Note: "Sundance Kid" did not enter the Swedish Singles Chart, but peaked at number 20 on the Swedish Heatseeker chart.)	—	Vapen & ammunition
2025	"Pärlor"	4	—	Vapen & ammunition
2025	"Socker"	39	—	Vapen & ammunition
2025	"Romeo återvänder ensam"	59	—	Du & jag döden
2025	"Mannen i den vita hatten (16 år senare)"	29	—	Du & jag döden
2025	"Ingenting någonsin"	— (Note: "Ingenting någonsin" did not enter the Swedish Singles Chart, but peaked at number 9 on the Swedish Heatseeker chart.)	—	Kent
2025	"Stenbrott"	— (Note: "Stenbrott" did not enter the Swedish Singles Chart, but peaked at number 1 on the Swedish Heatseeker chart.)	—	Kent
2025	"En timme en minut"	— (Note: "En timme en minut" did not enter the Swedish Singles Chart, but peaked at number 10 on the Swedish Heatseeker chart.)	—	Verkligen
"—" denotes items which were not released in that country or failed to chart.

Notes

- D "2000" was written as the theme song for the Swedish TV-series Hemlös (Swedish for "Homeless"), and all proceeds were donated to the foundation for the homeless of Stockholm, Stockholms hemlösa.

== Videography ==
The band never released any concert films during their career.

=== Music videos ===
Year	Title	Director(s)
1995	"När det blåser på månen"	Jonas Linell
1995	"Frank"	Adam Berg
1996	"Kräm (så nära får ingen gå)"	Adam Berg
1996	"Gravitation"	Adam Berg
1997	"Om du var här"	Adam Berg
1998	"Saker man ser"	Adam Berg
1998	"747" (English version)	Adam Berg
1999	"If You Were Here"	Adam Berg
1999	"Things She Said"	Adam Berg
1999	"Musik non stop"	Johan Renck
2000	"En himmelsk drog"	Johan Renck
2000	"Music Non Stop"	Johan Renck (Europe and Asia) / Adam Berg (USA)
2000	"Heavenly Junkies"	Johan Renck
2000	"Chans"	Adam Berg
2002	"Dom andra"	Adam Berg
2002	"Kärleken väntar"	Johan Renck
2002	"VinterNoll2"	Adam Berg
2002	"FF"	Adam Berg
2005	"Max 500"	Johan Renck
2005	"Palace & Main"	Adam Berg
2005	"Den döda vinkeln"	Marcus Engstrand
2005	"Dom som försvann"	Adam Berg
2007	"Ingenting"	Adam Berg, Mattias Montero
2007	"Columbus"	Popcore
2007	"Generation Ex"	Popcore
2008	"Vy från ett luftslott"^{[E]}	Lars Lind, Erik Lind, Kajsa Engdahl
2009	"Töntarna"	Johan Söderberg
2009	"Hjärta"	Robinovich
2010	"Idioter"	Gustav Johansson
2010	"Idioter" (alternativ version)	Leo Josefsson (as Le Monde de Leo)
2012	"999"	John Boisen, Björn Fävremark, Torbjörn Martin
2012	"Jag ser dig"	John Boisen, Björn Fävremark, Torbjörn Martin
2012	"Tänd på"	John Boisen, Björn Fävremark, Torbjörn Martin
2014	"Var är vi nu?"	John Boisen, Björn Fävremark
2014	"Mirage"	John Boisen, Björn Fävremark
2016	"Då Som Nu För Alltid" (promo)	Adam Berg
2016	"Den vänstra stranden"	Joanna Nordahl
2016	"Vi är för alltid"	Joanna Nordahl
2016	"Den sista sången"	Joanna Nordahl

Notes

- E Kent held a contest where fans were asked to submit their own videos of "Vy från ett luftslott". The band chose five finalists out of 65 entries, and the winner was picked through a poll on the band's forum.
