= Rocket Brothers =

- Rocket Brothers cover
- Directed by: Kasper Torsting
- Produced by: Sarita Christensen
- Music by: Kashmir
- Release date: 2003
- Running time: 87 min
- Country: Denmark
- Languages: Danish; English; Swedish

Rocket Brothers is a 2004 Danish documentary film directed by photographer Kasper Torsting, about the Danish rock band Kashmir.

Torsting followed the band over a period of four years starting just after the release of their third album The Good Life. The documentary follows the band during the process of making their fourth album Zitilites.

It also includes lead singer Kasper Eistrup's audition for Roger Waters' Pink Floyd tour. Eistrup auditioned as the lead singer and guitarist.
