= Ismael / Varje gång du möter min blick =

2010 single by Kent

"Ismael" / "Varje gång du möter min blick"

Single by Kent

from the album En plats i solen
- Released: 8 October 2010
- Studio: Park Studio (Stockholm)
- Genre: Alternative rock, pop rock
- Label: RCA, Sony Music
- Songwriter(s): Joakim Berg, Martin Sköld
- Producer(s): Kent, Stefan Boman, Joshua

Kent singles chronology
"Gamla Ullevi" / "Skisser för sommaren" (2010)	"Ismael" / "Varje gång du möter min blick" (2010)	"999" (2012)

"Ismael" / "Varje gång du möter min blick" is double A-side single by Swedish alternative rock band Kent. It was released on 8 October 2010 as the second single from their ninth studio album, En plats i solen. The single was released as a CD single limited to 1000 copies. It is their third double A-side single following the album's lead single "Gamla Ullevi" / "Skisser för sommaren" and "FF" / "VinterNoll2" from Vapen & ammunition.

== Track listing ==
All lyrics are written by Joakim Berg.

No.	Title	Music	Producer(s)	Length
1.	"Ismael"	Joakim Berg, Martin Sköld	Kent, Stefan Boman, Joshua	4:25
2.	"Varje gång du möter min blick" (Every Time You Meet My Gaze; single version)	Berg	Kent, Stefan Boman, Joshua	4:27

== Charts ==
=== Weekly charts ===
Weekly chart performance for "Ismael / Varje gång du möter min blick"
Chart (2010)	Peak position
Sweden (Sverigetopplistan)	13
