= Hjärta =

2009 single by Kent

Single by Kent

from the album Röd
- Released: 21 December 2009
- Genre: Alternative rock
- Length: 5:30
- Label: Sony
- Songwriter(s): Joakim Berg, Martin Sköld
- Producer(s): Kent, Joshua

Kent singles chronology
"2000" (2009)	"Hjärta" (2009)	"Idioter" (2010)

Music video
- "Hjärta" on YouTube

"Hjärta" is a song by Swedish alternative rock band Kent. It was released as the second single from the band's eighth studio album, Röd, on 21 December 2009 as digital download. The single contains the album version of "Hjärta" including two additional remixes.

== Music video ==
Kent made a music video for the song in collaboration with TV3's Efterlyst, where at the end of the video information was shown about a number of people who had been missing for a long time. The music video was directed by Robinovich. The video shows a number of naked people lying outside in the cold, holding a red thread.

== Track listing ==
"Hjärta" track listing
No.	Title	Music	Length
1.	"Hjärta" (Heart)	Joakim Berg, Martin Sköld	5:30
2.	"Hjärta" (Alf Tumble Remix Radio Edit)		4:16
3.	"Hjärta" (Alf Tumble Remix)		6:39
4.	"Hjärta" (Housewives Remix)		6:30

== Charts ==
=== Weekly charts ===
Weekly chart performance for "Hjärta"
Chart (2010)	Peak position
Sweden (Sverigetopplistan)	30
