= Jag är inte rädd för mörkret =

2012 album by Kent

Studio album by Kent
- Released: 25 April 2012
- Recorded: October–December 2011
- Studios: Studios la Fabrique (Saint-Rémy-de-Provence); Park Studio (Stockholm)
- Genres: Alternative rock, pop rock
- Length: 46:10
- Labels: Sonet, Universal
- Producers: Kent, Stefan Boman

Kent chronology
| En plats i solen (2010) | Jag är inte rädd för mörkret (2012) | Tigerdrottningen (2014) |

Singles from Jag är inte rädd för mörkret
- 1. "999" Released: 28 March 2012; 2. "Jag ser dig" Released: 27 June 2012; 3. "Tänd på" Released: 3 October 2012

Professional ratings
Review scores
| Source | Rating |
|---|---|
| Aftonbladet | 3/5 stars |
| Dagens Nyheter | 4/5 stars |
| Expressen | 4/5 stars |
| Ekstra Bladet | 5/6 stars |
| Gaffa | 4/6 stars |
| Göteborgs-Posten | 4/5 stars |
| Nöjesguiden | 4/6 stars |
| Svenska Dagbladet | 4/6 stars |
| Sydsvenskan | 4/5 stars |

Jag är inte rädd för mörkret (Swedish for I Am Not Afraid of the Dark) is the tenth studio album by Swedish alternative rock band Kent. It was released on 25 April 2012 by Sonet Records (Universal Music) and it was the band's debut release with the label since their departure from Sony Music in June 2011.

== Background and recording ==
In November 2011, Kent began recording Jag är inte rädd för mörkret in Studios la Fabrique in Saint-Rémy-de-Provence. The album was recorded in France over 17 days.

"The electronics are there, but we’re a bit more audible in the mix. After three albums following that approach, we felt the most fun thing to do was simply sit in a room and play again," the band said about the album.

== Promotion ==
On 28 March 2012, the lead single "999" was released. On March 30, the band released a bonus track titled "Ett år utan sommar" on SoundCloud. It was later released as a B-side on "Tänd på".

On 20 April 2012, the band posted four codes on their Twitter account that could be used to find four songs ("Tänd på", "Isis & Bast", "Jag ser dig" and "Petroleum") from the upcoming album on Spotify.

The day before the album was released, Kent held a large press conference in Stockholm.

== Critical reception ==
Anders Nunstedt of Expressen wrote: "There are no style changes here like Du och jag döden or Röd. The production is straight and uncomplicated, and the arrangements have a less electronic touch than that heard on the band's last three albums. [...] Kent has written some of their finest melodies, yet the great attraction lies in the lyrics. [...] The new songs often find a masterful harmony between heart and pain."

Markus Larsson of Aftonbladet wrote: "But Kent has definitely made records with a more urgent character and clearer identity. For the first time in a long time, I miss more things than I get. Like the brilliant friction between the safe radio hits and the anxiety on Vapen & ammunition. Like the magnificent darkness on Du & jag döden, an album that the band members today call "a giant hangover". Like the evocative anger on Röd or a fantastic song like 'Columbus'. It was music from a band with a lot of passion. While Jag är inte rädd för mörkret is an album that a band perhaps mostly releases because they can."

== Commercial performance ==
Jag är inte rädd för mörkret debuted at number one in Sweden, becoming Kent's ninth consecutive number-one album. In Denmark, the album debuted at number two. It is their highest-charting album there since Du & jag döden, which debuted at number two in 2005. The album debuted at number five in Finland, becoming the band's lowest-charting album since Hagnesta Hill, which peaked at number six in 2000. In Norway, Jag är inte rädd för mörkret debuted at number one, becoming Kent's first number-one album there since 2005's Du & jag döden.

== Track listing ==
All lyrics are written by Joakim Berg.

Jag är inte rädd för mörkret track listing
| No. | Title | Music | Length |
|---|---|---|---|
| 1. | "999" | Kent | 6:53 |
| 2. | "Petroleum" | Joakim Berg, Martin Sköld | 4:03 |
| 3. | "Isis & Bast" | Berg | 4:15 |
| 4. | "Jag ser dig" (I See You) | Berg | 5:36 |
| 5. | "Tänd på" (Ignite) | Berg, Sköld | 4:44 |
| 6. | "Beredd på allt" (Prepared for Everything) | Berg, Sköld | 4:35 |
| 7. | "Ruta 1" (Square 1) | Berg | 4:14 |
| 8. | "Färger på natten" (Colours at Night) | Berg | 4:14 |
| 9. | "Låt dom komma" (Let Them Come) | Berg, Sköld | 3:59 |
| 10. | "Hänsyn" (Consideration) | Kent | 3:37 |

== Personnel ==
"Jag ser dig" (2012)
Sample of track 4, "Jag ser dig".

Credits adapted from the liner notes of Jag är inte rädd för mörkret.

Kent

- Kent – music on track 1, 10
- Joakim Berg – music, lyrics, vocals, guitar
- Martin Sköld – music on track 2, 5, 6, 9, bass, keyboards
- Sami Sirviö – guitar, keyboards
- Markus Mustonen – drums, backing vocals, keyboards, piano

Additional musicians

- Petra Marklund – backing vocals on track 3

Technical

- Kent – producer, recording
- Stefan Boman – producer, recording, mixing on track 2, 6, 7, 8, 9, 10
- Niklas Flyckt – mixing on track 1, 3, 4, 5
- Anders Pantzer – mixing assistant
- Martin Brengesjö – instrument technician
- Damien Arlot – recording assistant
- Thomas Lefebvre – recording assistant
- Stephen Marcussen – mastering

Artwork

- Thomas Ökvist – design
- Helen Svensson – design

== Charts and certifications ==
=== Weekly charts ===
Weekly chart performance for Jag är inte rädd för mörkret
| Chart (2012) | Peak position |
|---|---|
| Danish Albums (Hitlisten) | 2 |
| Finnish Albums (Suomen virallinen lista) | 5 |
| Norwegian Albums (VG-lista) | 1 |
| Swedish Albums (Sverigetopplistan) | 1 |

=== Year-end charts ===
Year-end chart performance for Jag är inte rädd för mörkret
| Chart (2012) | Position |
|---|---|
| Swedish Albums (Sverigetopplistan) | 6 |

=== Certifications ===
| Region | Certification |
|---|---|
| Sweden (GLF) | Platinum |
