= Columbus (song) =

2007 song by Kent

Single by Kent

from the album Tillbaka till samtiden
- Released: 5 December 2007
- Genre: Alternative rock
- Length: 4:26
- Label: Sony BMG
- Songwriters: Joakim Berg, Martin Sköld
- Producers: Kent, Joshua

Kent singles chronology
"Ingenting" (2007)	"Columbus" (2007)	"Generation ex" (2008)

Music video
- "Columbus" on YouTube

"Columbus" is a song by Swedish alternative rock band Kent. It was released as the second single from the band's 2007 album Tillbaka till samtiden, on 5 December 2007. It contains the non-album track "Tick tack" and two additional remixes.

== Music video ==
The music video for "Columbus" was directed by Popcore and features scenes from the city of Stockholm.

== Track listing ==
All lyrics are written by Joakim Berg.

No.	Title	Music	Length
1.	"Columbus"	Joakim Berg, Martin Sköld	4:26
2.	"Columbus" (Krister Linder Remix)		7:19
3.	"Vid din sida" (By Your Side; Max Graham Club Remix)	Berg, Sköld	7:11
4.	"Tick tack" (Tick Tock)	Berg	4:01

== Charts ==
=== Weekly charts ===
Weekly chart performance for "Columbus"
Chart (2007–2008)	Peak position
Sweden (Sverigetopplistan)	3
