= Töntarna =

2009 single by Kent

Single by Kent

from the album Röd
- Released: 5 October 2009
- Genre: Alternative rock
- Length: 4:44
- Label: Sony
- Songwriter(s): Joakim Berg, Martin Sköld
- Producer(s): Kent, Joshua

Kent singles chronology
"Vy från ett luftslott" (2008)	"Töntarna" (2009)	"2000" (2009)

Music video
- "Töntarna" on YouTube

"Töntarna" is a song by the Swedish alternative rock band Kent. It was released as the lead single from their eighth studio album, Röd, on 5 October 2009. Two additional remixes by Punks Jump Up and Familjen were released on Kent's digital download store at their website on 9 October 2009, while a CD single was released on 12 October 2009.

== Track listing ==
All lyrics are written by Joakim Berg

"Töntarna" track listing
No.	Title	Music	Length
1.	"Töntarna" (The Dorks)	Joakim Berg, Martin Sköld	4:44
2.	"Töntarna" (Punks Jump Up Remix)		5:19
3.	"Töntarna" (Familjen Remix)		4:12

== Charts ==
=== Weekly charts ===
Weekly chart performance for "Töntarna"
Chart (2009)	Peak position
Finland (Suomen virallinen lista)	5
Norway (VG-lista)	1
Sweden (Sverigetopplistan)	1

=== Year-end charts ===
Year-end chart performance for "Töntarna"
Chart (2009)	Position
Sweden (Sverigetopplistan)	30

== Certifications ==
Certifications and sales for Töntarna
Region	Certification	Certified units/sales
Sweden (GLF)	Gold	10,000^{^}
^{^} Shipments figures based on certification alone.
