= Vy från ett luftslott =

2008 single by Kent

Single by Kent

from the album Tillbaka till samtiden
- Released: 15 June 2008
- Genre: Alternative rock; electro
- Length: 3:49
- Label: Sony BMG
- Songwriters: Joakim Berg, Martin Sköld
- Producers: Kent, Joshua

Kent singles chronology
"Generation Ex" (2008)	"Vy från ett luftslott" (2008)	"Töntarna" (2009)

Music video
- "Vy från ett luftslott (Punks Jump Up Remix)" on YouTube

"Vy från ett luftslott" (Swedish for View From a Castle in the Air) is the fourth and final single released from the album Tillbaka till samtiden, by the Swedish alternative rock band Kent. This is a one-track single featuring a remix of "Vy från ett luftslott" by Punks Jump Up. It was first released as a free download on Kent's website on 15 June 2008, then on CD on 2 July 2008.

== Music video ==
The remix is also used in the official music video, where Kent held a contest and asked fans to submit their own music videos. The band choose five finalist out of 65 entries, and the winner was selected in a poll on the band's forum. The video that won was created by Lars Lind, Erik Lind och Kajsa Engdahl from Östersund. The winners won Kent merchandise, VIP concert tickets and a meet and greet with Kent.

== Charts ==
Weekly chart performance for "Vy från ett luftslott"
Chart (2008)	Peak position
Sweden (Sverigetopplistan)	31
