= 2000 (song) =

2009 single by Kent

Single by Kent
- Released: 2 November 2009
- Genre: Alternative rock
- Length: 4:33
- Label: Sony
- Songwriter: Joakim Berg
- Producers: Kent, Joshua

Kent singles chronology
"Töntarna" (2009)	"2000" (2009)	"Hjärta" (2009)

Music video
- "2000" on YouTube

"2000" is a song by Swedish alternative rock band Kent. It was released in November 2009 and was used as the theme song for the Swedish TV-series Hemlösa, covering the homeless problem in Stockholm, and all proceeds were donated to the Foundation for the Homeless of Stockholm, Stockholms hemlösa. The song topped the Swedish Singles Chart for 1 week on the week ending 13 November 2009.

== Charts ==
=== Weekly charts ===
Weekly chart performance for "2000"
Chart (2009)	Peak position
Sweden (Sverigetopplistan)	1
