= Ingenting (song) =

2007 single by Kent

Single by Kent

from the album Tillbaka till samtiden
- Released: 17 September 2007
- Genre: Alternative rock
- Length: 4:05
- Label: RCA, Sony BMG
- Songwriter(s): Joakim Berg
- Producer(s): Joshua, Kent

Kent singles chronology
"Nålens öga" (2006)	"Ingenting" (2007)	"Columbus" (2007)

Music video
- "Ingenting" on YouTube

"'Ingenting" (Swedish for Nothing) is a song by Swedish alternative rock band Kent from their seventh studio album, Tillbaka till samtiden. It was released as the album's lead single on 17 September 2007 through RCA Records and Sony BMG.

== Critical reception ==
Anders Nunstedt of Expressen wrote: "The opening is sensational. First some chords on something that sounds like a deformed harp, then a disco beat that brings to mind old Pet Shop Boys and a synth riff that could have been signed by Depeche Mode. [...] The melody is irresistible and the lyrics, with their deep darkness and references to Hagnesta Hill, are immediately shocking. The Swedish single of the fall, without a doubt."

Håkan Steen of Aftonbladet wrote: "'Ingenting' is a strikingly direct Kent single, with a disco-dance elegance that breathes early 80s and old synth heroes. The melody becomes a good friend already during the first listen."

Fredrik Welander of Dagens Skiva wrote: "A usual bitter view from Joakim Berg. This time over an eighties synth beat with thick polyphonic sounds, electronic handclaps and distorted guitars after the chorus. Some lost piano notes and an enticing bass."

== Track listing ==
All lyrics are written by Joakim Berg.

No.	Title	Music	Length
1.	"Ingenting" (Nothing)	Joakim Berg	4:05
2.	"Ingenting" (Alex Dolby and Santos remix)		8:34
3.	"Ingenting" (Shieldster remix)		7:04
4.	"Ingenting" (Copyfokking rmx)		5:47
5.	"Min värld" (My World)	Berg	4:06

== Charts ==
=== Weekly charts ===
Weekly chart performance for "Ingenting"
Chart (2007)	Peak position
Denmark (Tracklisten)	11
Finland (Suomen virallinen lista)	17
Norway (VG-lista)	2
Sweden (Sverigetopplistan)	2

=== Year-end charts ===
Year-end chart performance for "Ingenting"
Chart (2007)	Position
Sweden (Sverigetopplistan)	17
