= Idioter =

2010 single by Kent

Single by Kent

from the album Röd
- Released: 8 March 2010
- Genre: Alternative rock
- Length: 4:16
- Label: Sony
- Songwriter(s): Joakim Berg, Martin Sköld
- Producer(s): Kent, Joshua

Kent singles chronology
"Hjärta" (2009)	"Idioter" (2010)	"Gamla Ullevi / Skisser för sommaren" (2010)

Music video
- "Idioter" on YouTube

"Idioter" is a song by Swedish alternative rock band Kent. It was released as the third and final single from the band's eight studio album, Röd, digitally on 8 March 2010, and physically on 10 March. The single contains a single and a demo version of "Idioter", a remix of "Taxmannen" by Andreas Tilliander, and the song "Ensamheten" with remixes by Andrea Parker and Erase.

"Idioter" peaked at number thirty-three in Sweden, the band's lowest chart position since "Halka", which peaked at number thirty-six in 1996.

== Track listing ==
"Idioter" track listing
No.	Title	Music	Length
1.	"Idioter" (Idiots; single version)	Joakim Berg, Martin Sköld	4:16
2.	"Taxmannen" (The Taxman; Andreas Tilliander Remix)	Berg, Sköld	3:51
3.	"Ensamheten" (The Loneliness; Andrea Parker Remix)	Berg, Sköld	7:06
4.	"Ensamheten" (Erase Remix)		5:41
5.	"Idioter" (demo)		4:38

== Charts ==
Chart performance for "Idioter"
Chart (2010)	Peak position
Sweden (Sverigetopplistan)	33
