= Gamla Ullevi (disambiguation) =

Gamla Ullevi may refer to:

- Gamla Ullevi (1916), a Swedish football stadium built in 1916, demolished in 2007
- Gamla Ullevi, a Swedish football stadium built in 2009 at the site of the 1916 stadium
- "Gamla Ullevi" / "Skisser för sommaren", a double A-side single by Kent
