= Generation Ex (song) =

2008 single by Kent

Single by Kent

from the album Tillbaka till samtiden
- Released: 7 April 2008
- Genre: Alternative rock
- Length: 4:22
- Label: RCA, Sony BMG
- Songwriter(s): Joakim Berg, Martin Sköld
- Producer(s): Kent, Joshua

Kent singles chronology
"Columbus" (2007)	"Generation Ex" (2008)	"Vy från ett luftslott" (2008)

Music video
- "Generation Ex" on YouTube

"Generation Ex" is a song by Swedish alternative rock band Kent. It was released in April 2008 as the third single from the album Tillbaka till samtiden. It contains a remix of "Berlin" by Simon Brenting, and the non-album bonus track "Det kanske kommer en förändring".

The female singer on "Generation Ex" is Camela Leierth.

== Music video ==
The music video for "Generation Ex" was directed by Popcore. The video is shot at the band's studio called Park Studio in Stockholm and features Kent and Camela Leierth.

== Track listing ==
All lyrics are written by Joakim Berg

No.	Title	Music	Length
1.	"Generation Ex"	Joakim Berg, Martin Sköld	4:22
2.	"Berlin" (Simon Brenting remix)	Berg, Sköld	6:46
3.	"Det kanske kommer en förändring" (There Might Come a Change)	Berg	4:25

== Charts ==
=== Weekly charts ===
Weekly chart performance for "Generation Ex"
Chart (2008)	Peak position
Sweden (Sverigetopplistan)	9
