= Chans (Kent song) =

2000 single by Kent

Single by Kent

from the album B-sidor 95–00
- Released: 22 November 2000
- Genre: Alternative rock
- Label: BMG Sweden/RCA Victor
- Songwriter(s): Joakim Berg
- Producer(s): Kent, Nåid

Kent singles chronology
"Kevlarsjäl" (2000)	"Chans" (2000)	"Dom andra" (2002)

Music video
- "Chans" on YouTube

"Chans" (Swedish for Chance) is a song by Swedish alternative rock band Kent. It was released in November 2000. The single has the song Chans, one of two completely new songs from the b-side compilation album B-Sidor 95-00. The second track is an official remix of 747. It was made by the producer of the two new songs; Nåid (also known as Martin Landquist). The sleeve has photos taken by Jonas Linell on the arctic Norwegian island of Svalbard.

== Music video ==
The music video for "Chans" was directed by Adam Berg. The video is a compilation of footage from old music videos.

== Track listing ==
All lyrics are written by Joakim Berg.

CD single track listing
No.	Title	Music	Length
1.	"Chans" (Chance; radio edit)	Joakim Berg	4:26
2.	"747" (Nåid 2000 Remix)	Berg	4:31

== Charts ==
=== Weekly charts ===
Weekly chart performance for "Chans"
Chart (2000)	Peak position
Sweden (Sverigetopplistan)	14
