= Palace & Main =

2005 song by Kent

Single by Kent

from the album Du & jag döden
- Released: 4 May 2005
- Studio: Park Studio (Stockholm)
- Genre: Alternative rock
- Label: BMG Sweden/RCA
- Songwriters: Joakim Berg, Martin Sköld
- Producers: Kent, Stefan Boman

Kent singles chronology
"Max 500" (2005)	"Palace & Main" (2005)	"Den döda vinkeln" (2005)

Music video
- "Palace & Main" on YouTube

"Palace & Main" is a song by Swedish alternative rock band Kent. It was released on 4 May 2005 as the second single from their album Du & Jag Döden.

The song title refers to an intersection in Portland, Oregon. The single contains two B-sides, "Nihilisten" and "Alla mot Alla".

== Music video ==
The music video is filmed on a simple DV-camera by the director Adam Berg (brother of lead singer Joakim Berg). It features guitarist Harri Mänty as he travels to Las Vegas to gamble the entire video budget of 300,000 kronor (roughly 50,000 USD) on the roulette. He puts the money on black, and wins. In the end of the video he rides away in a limousine, cheering and sipping champagne.

Afterwards, the profits were donated to Barncancerfonden, a fund for children with cancer.

== Track listing ==
All lyrics are written by Joakim Berg.

No.	Title	Music	Length
1.	"Palace & Main"	Joakim Berg, Martin Sköld	4:05
2.	"Nihilisten" (The Nihilist)	Berg	4:14
3.	"Alla mot Alla" (All against All)	Berg	4:00

== Charts ==
=== Weekly charts ===
Weekly chart performance for "Palace & Main"
Chart (2005)	Peak position
Finland (Suomen virallinen lista)	5
Sweden (Sverigetopplistan)	1

=== Year-end charts ===
Year-end chart performance for "Palace & Main"
Chart (2005)	Position
Sweden (Sverigetopplistan)	45
