= Dom andra =

2002 single by Kent

Single by Kent

from the album Vapen & ammunition
- Released: 18 March 2002
- Genre: Alternative rock
- Label: RCA
- Songwriter(s): Joakim Berg

Kent singles chronology
"Chans" (2000)	"Dom andra" (2002)	"Kärleken väntar" (2002)

Music video
- "Dom andra" on YouTube

"Dom andra" (Swedish for The Others) is a song by Swedish alternative rock band Kent. It was released as the first single from their fifth album Vapen & Ammunition on 18 March 2002. The song debuted at number one on the Swedish Singles Chart, becoming the band's first number-one hit. It stayed at the position for four weeks and remained on the chart for twenty-one weeks overall.

The single includes the B-side "Vintervila" that is a remake of a song composed when the band used the name Havsänglar in the early 1990s. On the sleeve is a photo of one of the Eskilstuna Zoo's white tigers (taken by Jonas Linell).

The track won Song of the Year at both the 2003 Grammis and 2003 P3 Guld awards.

== Music video ==
The music video shows a woman driving a car (Ferrari 456 GT) through Stockholm city at night. Joakim Berg can be seen as a shadow in the passenger side window and Sami Sirviö in the driver's side window.

== Track listing ==
All lyrics are written by Joakim Berg.

No.	Title	Music	Length
1.	"Dom andra" (The Others)	Joakim Berg	3:46
2.	"Vintervila" (Winter Rest)	Berg	4:14

== Charts ==
=== Weekly charts ===
Weekly chart performance for "Dom andra"
Chart (2002)	Peak position
Finland (Suomen virallinen lista)	5
Norway (VG-lista)	8
Sweden (Sverigetopplistan)	1

=== Year-end charts ===
Year-end chart performance for "Dom andra"
Chart (2002)	Position
Sweden (Sverigetopplistan)	10

== Covers ==
In 2003, the Finnish singer Reijo Taipale recorded a Finnish-language cover version called Ihan kuin nuo toiset.

In 2009, Carolina Wallin Pérez debuted with the album Pärlor och svin with covers of Kent songs, which included Dom Andra.

In 2023, Ihsahn covered the song with Jonas Renkse on his Fascination Street Sessions EP.
