= Tänd på =

2012 single by Kent

Single by Kent

from the album Jag är inte rädd för mörkret
- B-side: "Ett år utan sommar"
- Released: 3 October 2012
- Recorded: Saint-Rémy-de-Provence, France (Studios la Fabrique); Älvsjö, Stockholm, Sweden (Park Studio)
- Genre: Alternative rock
- Length: 4:43
- Label: Sonet, Universal
- Songwriter(s): Joakim Berg, Martin Sköld
- Producer(s): Kent, Stefan Boman

Kent singles chronology
"Jag ser dig" (2012)	"Tänd på" (2012)	"La Belle Epoque" (2014)

Music video
- "Tänd på" on YouTube

"Tänd på" is a song by Swedish alternative rock band Kent from their 10th studio album Jag är inte rädd för mörkret. It was released as the album's third and final single on 3 October 2012. Prior to its official release, the song charted at number 37 in Sweden.

== Track listing ==
No.	Title	Lyrics	Music	Length
1.	"Tänd på" (Light Up)	Joakim Berg	Berg, Martin Sköld	4:44
2.	"Ett år utan sommar" (A Year Without Summer)	Berg	Berg	3:15

== Charts ==
Chart (2012)	Peak position
Sweden (Sverigetopplistan)	37
