= Hiraeth (EP) =

2026 extended play by Joakim Berg

EP by Joakim Berg
- Released: 11 December 2026
- Studio: Hamsterdam Studios (Stockholm)
- Label: Universal Music
- Producer: Joakim Berg

Joakim Berg chronology
Framtiden som aldrig blev av (2026)	Hiraeth (2026)

Singles from Hiraeth
- 1. "Arkadien" Released: 11 September 2026; 2. "Moderna tider" Released: 2 October 2026

Hiraeth (Welsh for Homesickness) is an upcoming EP by Swedish songwriter Joakim Berg. It will be released on 11 December 2026.

== Background ==
Joakim Berg said this about the EP: "Sometimes you write more songs than you need for an album, and these five ended up being left behind. But they certainly weren't cut because I like them any less; it was simply that the ten released last spring formed a more cohesive whole. I view the new ones as a complement, and I love them."

== Track listing ==
All tracks are written by Joakim Berg.

Hiraeth track listing
No.	Title	Length
1.	"När hon ler" (When She Smiles)	4:29
2.	"Moderna tider" (Modern Times)	4:33
3.	"Gränsland"	3:13
4.	"Arkadien" (Arcadia)	3:55
5.	"Esteter" (Aesthetes)	3:17

== Personnel ==
Joakim Berg

- Joakim Berg – music, lyrics, vocals, guitar, backing vocals, keyboards, piano

Additional musicians

- Heikki Kiviaho – bass on track 2

Technical

- Joakim Berg – production, recording
- Michael Ilbert – mixing
- Björn Engelmann – mastering

Artwork

- Karl-Magnus Boske – design
