= 999 (Kent song) =

2012 song by Swedish band Kent

Single by Kent

from the album Jag är inte rädd för mörkret
- Released: 28 March 2012
- Studio: Studios la Fabrique (Saint-Rémy-de-Provence); Park Studio (Stockholm)
- Genre: Alternative rock
- Length: 6:53
- Label: Sonet; Universal
- Composer(s): Kent
- Lyricist(s): Joakim Berg
- Producer(s): Kent; Stefan Boman

Kent singles chronology
"Ismael / Varje gång du möter min blick" (2010)	"999" (2012)	"Jag ser dig" (2012)

Music video
- "999" on YouTube

"999" is a song by Swedish alternative rock band Kent from their tenth studio album, Jag är inte rädd för mörkret. It was released as the album's lead single on 28 March 2012. The song peaked at number ten in Sweden, becoming Kent's sixteenth top ten single.

== Music video ==
On 19 March 2012, it became known that Kent could have performed the song on the Swedish-Norwegian TV talk show Skavlan, but when SVT wanted Kent to play a shorter version of the song, the band chose instead to not appear at all. In order for Kent's fans to still see a live version of the song, a video was released on YouTube on 27 March where the band performed the song in a studio.

== Charts ==
=== Weekly charts ===
Weekly chart performance for "999"
Chart (2012)	Peak position
Sweden (Sverigetopplistan)	10

=== Year-end charts ===
Year-end chart performance for "999"
Chart (2012)	Position
Sweden (Sverigetopplistan)	92
