= Röd =

2009 album by Kent

Studio album by Kent
- Released: 5 November 2009
- Recorded: 2009
- Studios: Hansa Tonstudio (Berlin); Park Studio (Stockholm); The Bowery Hotel (New York City)
- Genres: Alternative rock, synthpop
- Length: 56:36
- Labels: RCA, Sony
- Producers: Kent, Joshua

Kent chronology
Box 1991–2008 (2008)	Röd (2009)	En plats i solen (2010)

Singles from Röd
- 1. "Töntarna" Released: 5 October 2009; 2. "Hjärta" Released: 21 December 2009; 3. "Idioter" Released: 8 March 2010

Röd (Swedish for Red) is the eighth studio album by Swedish alternative rock band Kent. It was released on 5 November 2009 through RCA Records and Sony BMG. It was released as digital download exclusively through the band's website (Kent.nu) on 5 November and physically on 6 November.

== Background and recording ==
Lead singer Joakim Berg announced on Kent's forum on 21 April 2009, that the band had started writing songs for the album in 2008 until the beginning of April 2009 and subsequently the band had begun the recording of the album. The album is produced by Kent and Joshua, who also produced the band's previous studio album.

Eight out of 11 songs were recorded in the concert hall Meistersaal in Berlin. It was originally part of the legendary Hansa Tonstudio from the 1970s until 1991, but has since been used as a location for events. Kent had to set up their own recording studio, with the recording costs being around 3 million SEK according to Joakim Berg.

== Promotion ==
The lead single, "Töntarna", was released on 5 October 2009, and reached number one in Sweden (Sverigetopplistan) and Norway (VG-lista).

On 30 October, Kent performed "Svarta linjer" on the Norwegian-Swedish television talk show Skavlan.

On the release day of Röd, Kent arranged a launch party at The Bowery Hotel in New York. Kent played in front of a hundred specially invited guests and the setlist consisted of 6 tracks from the new album, and the whole thing was shown live on Aftonbladet's website.

On 11 November 2009, the band released a deluxe edition box of the album. It features the 11-track CD, a USB flash drive with high quality MP3 files as well as AIFF files, three 10" records which between them contain the whole album, and a 118-page book containing lyrics, abstract pictures and photographs.

== Critical reception ==
Professional ratings
Review scores
Source	Rating
Aftonbladet	4/5 stars
Dagens Skiva	8/10
Expressen	4/5 stars
GAFFA	5/6 stars
Metro	3/5 stars
Svenska Dagbladet	4/6 stars

Anders Nunstedt of Expressen wrote: "The fact that the album was recorded in Berlin, in the Hansa Tonstudio where U2, Depeche Mode and David Bowie reinvented themselves, also says a lot. The band's eighth studio album captures the sound of a European metropolis at night, while sounding unmistakably Kent. Jocke Berg sings about highways and jet planes as well as small-town road crossings and giving someone a ride home on a bicycle. [...] Röd is certainly no Vapen & ammunition - it will be hard to find more than two working radio singles here - but the sound is world class and the quality shines through in every track."

Markus Larsson of Aftonbladet wrote: "The grandiose synth symphonies contain everything from acoustic guitars, techno beats and arena rock drums. Often in one and the same six-minute long song. It might have been unbearable to listen to if Kent didn't constantly anchor the music in fantastic melodies. Those who grow forth and illuminate the darkness in, for example, 'Vals för Satan (din vän pessimisten)', 'Sjukhus' and 'Idioter' are among the strongest songs the group have written. Röd is, above all, proof that the best pop music is always a mixture of anger, resistance and despair."

== Track listing ==
All lyrics are written by Joakim Berg; all music is composed by Joakim Berg and Martin Sköld.

Röd track listing
No.	Title	Length
1.	"18:29-4"	2:26
2.	"Taxmannen" (The Taxman)	4:32
3.	"Krossa allt" (Crush Everything)	4:48
4.	"Hjärta" (Heart)	5:30
5.	"Sjukhus" (Hospital)	6:16
6.	"Vals för Satan (Din vän pessimisten)" (Waltz for Satan (Your Friend the Pessimist))	6:47
7.	"Idioter" (Idiots)	4:12
8.	"Svarta linjer" (Black Lines)	4:27
9.	"Ensamheten" (The Loneliness)	5:46
10.	"Töntarna" (The Dorks)	4:37
11.	"Det finns inga ord" (There Are No Words)	6:59

== Personnel ==
Credits adapted from the liner notes of Röd.

Kent

- Joakim Berg – music, lyrics, vocals, guitar
- Martin Sköld – music, bass, keyboards
- Sami Sirviö – guitar, keyboards
- Markus Mustonen – drums, backing vocals, keyboards, piano

Additional musicians

- Yngve Sköld – leader of the "Tonalerna" choir on track 1
- Johan T Karlsson – choir on track 3, 9
- Johan Renck – choir on track 6

Technical

- Kent – producer
- Joshua – producer, recording, mixing on track 2, 3, 10
- Stefan Boman – mixing on track 1, 5, 6, 9
- Simon Nordberg – mixing on track 4, 7, 8, 11
- Martin Brengesjö – instrument technician
- Sebastian Meyer – assistant
- Henrik Jonsson – mastering

Artwork

- Annika Aschberg – photography
- Makode Linde – photography
- Thomas Ökvist – design, photography
- Helen Svensson – design
- Dora Kovács – girl on the cover

== Charts and certifications ==
=== Weekly charts ===
Weekly chart performance for Röd
Chart (2009)	Peak position
Danish Albums (Hitlisten)	6
Finnish Albums (Suomen virallinen lista)	4
Norwegian Albums (VG-lista)	4
Swedish Albums (Sverigetopplistan)	1

=== Year-end charts ===
Year-end chart performance for Röd
Chart (2009)	Position
Swedish Albums (Sverigetopplistan)	4
Chart (2010)	Position
Swedish Albums (Sverigetopplistan)	44

=== Certifications ===
Country	Certification (sales thresholds)
Sweden	2× Platinum
