= Framtiden som aldrig blev av =

Studio album by Joakim Berg
- Released: 29 May 2026
- Studio: Hamsterdam Studios (Stockholm)
- Genre: Pop rock
- Length: 38:26
- Label: Universal Music
- Producer: Joakim Berg

Joakim Berg chronology
| Jag fortsätter glömma (2022) | Framtiden som aldrig blev av (2026) | Hiraeth (2026) |

Singles from Framtiden som aldrig blev av
- 1. "Över" Released: 27 February 2026; 2. "Blindgångare" / "Du är vid liv" Released: 17 April 2026

Professional ratings
Review scores
| Source | Rating |
|---|---|
| Aftonbladet | 3/5 stars |
| Expressen | 3/5 stars |
| Gaffa | 5/6 stars |
| Göteborgs-Posten | 4/5 stars |
| Sydsvenskan | 4/5 stars |

Framtiden som aldrig blev av (Swedish for The Future That Never Came to Be) is the second solo album by Joakim Berg. It was released on 29 May 2026. It debuted atop the Swedish albums chart on 5 June 2026.

== Background ==
Most of the songs were written during the spring and autumn of 2025. Joakim Berg said this about the album: "When we were done with the shows in March last year, there was a calmness and a desire to write something new and clean out the old. It also suddenly turned out to be very fun to play and hear guitars again. So acoustic and electric ones quite naturally got a big place in the soundscape of the album, even though it wasn't a stated goal."

== Promotion ==
On 27 February 2026, the first single "Över" was released. On 17 April, the double single "Blindgångare" / "Du är vid liv" was released. Ahead of the release of this single, a phone booth was set up at Sergels Torg in Stockholm on 14 April, where people could go in and listen to the two songs. On 18 April, a 7″ vinyl was released in 1000 copies. Side A being “Blindgångare” and side B being “Över”.

From May 23–26 and May 29–30, fans had the opportunity to experience the album in an installation at Fotografiska in Stockholm. Together with Martin Sköld, Joakim Berg created an experience where music and photos are woven together. The album was played in its entirety while Sköld's photographs was projected onto the walls, enhancing the feeling and expression of the music.

== Track listing ==
All lyrics are written by Joakim Berg; all music is composed by Joakim Berg.

Framtiden som aldrig blev av track listing
| No. | Title | Length |
|---|---|---|
| 1. | "Ultraviolett" (Ultraviolet) | 3:48 |
| 2. | "Land" | 3:46 |
| 3. | "Du är vid liv" (You Are Alive) | 3:23 |
| 4. | "Den sjunde vågen" (The Seventh Wave) | 3:58 |
| 5. | "Över" (Over) | 3:49 |
| 6. | "När världen var grön" (When the World Was Green) | 3:55 |
| 7. | "Blindgångare" (Dud) | 3:54 |
| 8. | "Nyårsdag" (New Year's Day) | 3:44 |
| 9. | "Den mörka sidan månen" (The Dark Side of the Moon) | 2:18 |
| 10. | "Fåglarna" (The Birds) | 5:45 |

== Personnel ==
Joakim Berg

- Joakim Berg – music, lyrics, vocals, guitar, backing vocals, keyboards, piano

Additional musicians

- Maria Jane Smith – backing vocals on track 1, 2, 4, 6
- Heikki Kiviaho – bass on track 1–9

Technical

- Joakim Berg – production, recording
- Michael Ilbert – mixing
- Björn Engelmann – mastering

Artwork

- Martin Sköld – photography
- Karl-Magnus Boske – design
- Zhanna Emelianov – girl on the cover

== Charts ==
Weekly chart performance for Framtiden som aldrig blev av
| Chart (2026) | Peak position |
|---|---|
| Swedish Albums (Sverigetopplistan) | 1 |
