= Gamla Ullevi / Skisser för sommaren =

2010 single by Kent

"Gamla Ullevi" / "Skisser för sommaren"

Single by Kent

from the album En plats i solen
- Released: 14 June 2010
- Recorded: 2010
- Studio: Park Studio (Stockholm)
- Genre: Alternative rock
- Label: Sony
- Songwriter(s): Joakim Berg, Martin Sköld
- Producer(s): Kent, Stefan Boman

Kent singles chronology
| "Idioter" (2010) | "Gamla Ullevi" / "Skisser för sommaren" (2010) | "Ismael" / "Varje gång du möter min blick" (2010) |

"Gamla Ullevi" / "Skisser för sommaren" is double A-side single by Swedish alternative rock band Kent. It was released on 14 June 2010 as the lead single from their ninth studio album, En plats i solen.

It is their second double A-side single following "FF" / "VinterNoll2" from 2002. Both tracks charted in the top of the Swedish chart, at numbers one and two, respectively.

== Critical reception ==
Markus Larsson of Aftonbladet wrote: "'Gamla Ullevi' begins with a synth loop, then African drums kick in with samba intensity. Pretty soon, 'Gamla Ullevi' becomes excellent synthpop that bubbles and sparkles. The song may be among the most uplifting and danceable the group has ever released. The other “a-side”, 'Skisser för sommaren', is more laid-back and mid-tempo and comfortable. The handclaps and guitars are tied together by a big sing-along "la-la-la"."

== Track listing ==
All lyrics are written by Joakim Berg.

| No. | Title | Music | Producer(s) | Length |
|---|---|---|---|---|
| 1. | "Gamla Ullevi" (Gamla Ullevi) | Joakim Berg, Martin Sköld | Kent, Stefan Boman | 3:38 |
| 2. | "Skisser för sommaren" (Sketches for the Summer) | Berg | Kent, Boman, Joshua | 4:14 |

== Charts ==
=== Weekly charts ===
Weekly chart performance for "Gamla Ullevi / Skisser för sommaren"
| Chart (2010) | Peak position |
|---|---|
| Sweden (Sverigetopplistan) | 1 |
| Sweden (Sverigetopplistan) | 2 |
