= No Balance Palace =

Studio album by Kashmir
- Released: 10 October 2005
- Recorded: Sun Studios, Copenhagen and Looking Glass Studios, New York City
- Genre: Rock, Alternative rock
- Length: 45:56
- Label: Sony
- Producer: Tony Visconti

Kashmir chronology
Zitilites (2003)	No Balance Palace (2005)	Trespassers (2010)

No Balance Palace is the fifth album by the Danish band Kashmir. It was released on 10 October 2005. The album features a duet between Kasper Eistrup and David Bowie on "The Cynic", and Lou Reed on "Black Building", and was produced by Tony Visconti. The first single was "The Curse of Being a Girl".

The cover art is an abstract painting by El Lissitzky called "Abstract Cabinet" (1927).

Words by Kasper Eistrup. Music by Kasper Eistrup except where noted.

== Track listing ==
No.	Title	Music	Length
1.	"Kalifornia"		5:26
2.	"Jewel Drop"		4:20
3.	"The Cynic" (featuring David Bowie)		4:23
4.	"Ophelia"		3:56
5.	"Diana Ross"	Eistrup with Henrik Lindstrand	0:31
6.	"The Curse of Being a Girl"		3:39
7.	"She's Made of Chalk"	Eistrup with Henrik Lindstrand	5:06
8.	"Ether"		5:21
9.	"Snowman"	Eistrup with Henrik Lindstrand	3:14
10.	"Black Building" (featuring Lou Reed)	Eistrup with Henrik Lindstrand, Asger Engholm Techau & Mads Tunebjerg	1:58
11.	"No Balance Palace"	Eistrup with Henrik Lindstrand, Asger Engholm Techau & Mads Tunebjerg	8:03

- Australian Tour Edition bonus tracks:

12. "Supergirl (Demonstrations Skizze)" – 3:57
13. "She's Made of Chalk (Single Revision)" – 4:01

- Japan bonus tracks (SICP 1019):

12. "Ding A Ling" – 5:41
13. "Snowman (Organic Draft)" – 2:58
14. "The Dusk Hour (Sidestep Walk)" – 5:15
15. "Supergirl (Demonstrations Skizze)" – 3:58
