= Saker man ser =

1998 single by Kent

Single by Kent

from the album Isola
- Released: 26 January 1998 (Swedish version); 7 September 1998 (English version)
- Genre: Alternative rock
- Length: 3:54
- Label: BMG Sweden/RCA Victor
- Songwriter: Joakim Berg
- Producer: Zed

Kent singles chronology
"Om du var här" (1997)	"Saker man ser" (1998)	"747" (1998)

Music video
- "Saker man ser" on YouTube

"Saker man ser" is a song by Swedish alternative rock band Kent. It was released in January 1998 as the second single from the album Isola. It includes the two b-sides, "December" and "Längesen vi sågs". The song charted at number 22 in Sweden.

A version in English was also released under the title "Things She Said". In August 1998 Kent performed the English version "Things She Said" on the Dutch music show 2 Meter Sessions. Hayley Williams from Paramore has stated that she is a fan of the band and that her favorite song of them is "Things She Said". She has also covered the song several times.

== Track listing ==
All lyrics are written by Joakim Berg.

CD maxi track listing
No.	Title	Music	Length
1.	"Saker man ser" (Things You See)	Joakim Berg	3:54
2.	"December"	Berg	3:46
3.	"Längesen vi sågs" (Long Time No See)	Berg	4:29

Cardboard sleeve CD track listing
No.	Title	Music	Length
1.	"Saker man ser"		3:54
2.	"Glider"	Berg	4:04

English version CD single track listing
No.	Title	Music	Length
1.	"Things She Said"	Berg	3:54
2.	"Unprofessional (Live Radio Session)"	Berg	4:34
3.	"What It Feels Like" (English Version of Kräm)	Berg, Martin Sköld	2:42

== Charts ==
Weekly chart performance for "Saker man ser"
Chart (1998)	Peak position
Sweden (Sverigetopplistan)	22
