= En plats i solen (Kent album) =

2010 Kent studio album

Studio album by Kent
- Released: 30 June 2010
- Recorded: April–June 2010
- Studio: Park Studio (Stockholm)
- Genres: Alternative rock, synthpop
- Labels: RCA, Sony Music
- Producers: Kent, Stefan Boman, Joshua

Kent chronology
Röd (2009)	En plats i solen (2010)	Jag är inte rädd för mörkret (2012)

Singles from En plats i solen
- 1. "Gamla Ullevi" / "Skisser för sommaren" Released: 14 June 2010; 2. "Ismael" / "Varje gång du möter min blick" Released: 8 October 2010

Professional ratings
Review scores
Source	Rating
Aftonbladet	4/5 stars
Expressen	4/5 stars
Gaffa	3/6 stars
Göteborgs-Posten	4/5 stars
Lydverket	5/6 stars
Nöjesguiden	4/6 stars
Svenska Dagbladet	4/6 stars

En plats i solen (Swedish for A Place in the Sun) is the ninth studio album by Swedish alternative rock band Kent. It was released on 30 June 2010, just eight months after the release of their previous album, Röd, but was released exclusively as digital download on the band's website on 23 June.

== Background and recording ==
The album was written and recorded in the early spring of 2010, and was finished on 8 June. Some of the songs are leftovers (demos) from the recording of Röd. A few seconds of "Glasäpplen" can be heard at the end of the song "Det finns inga ord". Lead singer Joakim Berg told Svenska Dagbladet that they wanted to record the songs "while they were still fresh".

The album was produced primarily with Swedish producer Stefan Boman, who worked with the band on Du & jag döden from 2005.

== Promotion ==
The lead single, "Gamla Ullevi" / "Skisser för sommaren", was released on 14 June 2010, the same day as the band announced the album details. It reached number one in Sweden (Sverigetopplistan).

The second single, "Ismael / Varje gång du möter min blick", was released on 8 October.

== Critical reception ==
Håkan Steen of Aftonbladet wrote: "If the album Röd was an unusually ambitious experiment with synths, En plats i solen feels like the album where the new electronics have settled in as a natural part of Kent's sound. [...] It sounds comfortable and harmonious, perhaps a little more directly pop and dance than in a long time. [...] This is not to say that the band have in any way made an upbeat party record. En plats i solen sounds more like the soundtrack to hungover July Sundays and sentimental August evenings, where the music soothes and Jocke Berg's lyrics add comforting thoughts about transience and the eternal search for something more."

Glenn Olsen of Lydverket wrote: "The album alternates nicely between uptempo club bangers, mid-tempo pop songs and delicate ballads, such as the beautiful closing duet 'Passagerare' where Jocke Berg is joined by the jazz singer Rebecka Törnquist. [...] They [Kent] make it sound so annoyingly easy. Airy, playful and effortless, as if it were the easiest thing in the world to create the perfect soundtrack for the coming summer."

Daniel Magnusson of Gaffa wrote: "En plats i solen feels like a last-minute trip. A spontaneous idea. The idea that things may go a little as they go and the end result will be neither fully satisfactory nor nightmarish."

Asbjørn Moe of Groove.no wrote: "If there's anyone who can write depressing lyrics and sad melodies, it's Kent. Although this record in many ways has a lighter and brighter overall expression than the previous releases, they manage to balance the album's 10 songs both with catchy and danceable hits, but also the dark ballads that are the very trademark of the band. That is perhaps the reason why En plats i solen can excite an even larger audience than before."

== Commercial performance ==
The album peaked at number one in Sweden and Finland, number two in Norway and number four in Denmark.

== Track listing ==
All lyrics are written by Joakim Berg.

En plats i solen track listing
No.	Title	Music	Producer(s)	Length
1.	"Glasäpplen" (Glass Apples)	Joakim Berg, Martin Sköld	Kent, Stefan Boman	4:48
2.	"Ismael"	Berg, Sköld	Kent, Boman, Joshua	4:25
3.	"Skisser för sommaren" (Sketches for the Summer)	Berg	Kent, Boman, Joshua	4:14
4.	"Ärlighet respekt kärlek" (Honesty Respect Love)	Berg, Sköld	Kent, Boman	4:28
5.	"Varje gång du möter min blick" (Every Time You Meet My Gaze)	Berg	Kent, Boman, Joshua	4:27
6.	"Ensam lång väg hem" (Lonely Long Way Home)	Berg	Kent, Boman	4:11
7.	"Team Building"	Berg, Sköld	Kent, Boman	3:58
8.	"Gamla Ullevi"	Berg, Sköld	Kent, Boman	3:38
9.	"Minimalen" (The Minimal)	Berg, Sköld	Kent, Boman	4:21
10.	"Passagerare" (Passengers/Passenger)	Berg	Kent, Boman	4:18

== Personnel ==
Credits adapted from the liner notes of En plats i solen.

Kent

- Joakim Berg – music, lyrics, vocals, guitar
- Martin Sköld – music on track 1, 2, 4, 7, 8, 9, bass, keyboards
- Sami Sirviö – guitar, keyboards
- Markus Mustonen – drums, backing vocals, keyboards, piano

Additional musicians

- Sebastian Meyer – percussion, choir on track 3
- Joakim Milder – strings arrangement and conductor
- Stockholm Session Strings – strings
- Anders "Boba" Lindström – choir on track 4
- Lars Winnerbäck – choir on track 4
- Heikki Kiviaho – choir on track 7
- Rebecka Törnqvist – duet on track 10

Technical

- Kent – producer
- Stefan Boman – producer and mixing
- Joshua – production on track 2, 3, 5
- Martin Brengesjö – instrument technician
- Sebastian Meyer – recording assistant
- Hoffe Stannow – mastering

Artwork

- Anders Thessing – photography
- Thomas Ökvist – design, photography
- Helen Svensson – design

== Charts and certifications ==
=== Weekly charts ===
Weekly chart performance for En plats i solen
Chart (2010)	Peak position
Danish Albums (Hitlisten)	4
Finnish Albums (Suomen virallinen lista)	1
Norwegian Albums (VG-lista)	2
Swedish Albums (Sverigetopplistan)	1

=== Year-end charts ===
Year-end chart performance for En plats i solen
Chart (2010)	Position
Swedish Albums (Sverigetopplistan)	2

=== Certifications ===
Country	Certifications
Finland	Gold
Sweden	Platinum
