= Jag fortsätter glömma =

Studio album by Joakim Berg
- Released: 27 May 2022
- Studio: Hamsterdam Studios (Stockholm)
- Genre: Pop rock
- Length: 47:19
- Label: Universal Music
- Producer: Joakim Berg

Joakim Berg chronology
Jag fortsätter glömma (2022)	Framtiden som aldrig blev av (2026)

Professional ratings
Review scores
Source	Rating
Aftonbladet	4/5 stars
Expressen	3/5 stars
Gaffa	5/6 stars
Göteborgs-Posten	3/5 stars
Svenska Dagbladet	4/6 stars

Jag fortsätter glömma (Swedish for I continue to forget) is the first solo album by Joakim Berg. It was released on 27 May 2022. It debuted atop the Swedish albums chart on 3 June 2022.

== Background ==
On 12 May 2022, Berg announced his first solo album Jag fortsätter glömma. He said the idea took off in 2019: "September 2019. It all started very simply. I was a little less tired of myself than usual and had a song idea where there was a little spark of magic. I wrote lyrics with the intention of singing it myself for the first time in years. I wrote, recorded, played all instruments, sang and produced it in two days. This is the beginning of my own album. As I in my foolishness promised dearly and sacrosanctly to never do. I decided to finish five songs without talking about it or letting anyone else listen. Mostly to get into the flow and avoid reacting to comments from outside. Nothing ever goes as planned, and this collection of songs is no exception. They do not sound like what I imagined when I started. But I have really tried to let the notes and lyrics take the paths they wanted without involving the brain in processes it has nothing to do with. So the 11 songs that made it to the album are simply the ones that hit me hardest. It is just to humbly capitulate to the fact. This is surely what I like. Today. Hope you like it too."

== Track listing ==
All lyrics are written by Joakim Berg.

Jag fortsätter glömma track listing
No.	Title	Music	Length
1.	"Barn av vår tid" (Children of Our Time)	Joakim Berg	3:53
2.	"Begravningsbål" (Funeral Bonfire)	Berg	4:09
3.	"Aniara"	Berg	4:49
4.	"Låtsasvärlden" (The Pretend World)	Berg	3:56
5.	"Legender" (Legends)	Berg	5:12
6.	"Ingenmansland" (No Man's Land)	Berg	4:47
7.	"Var vi kom ifrån" (Where We Came From)	Berg	3:58
8.	"Då var allt" (Then Was Everything)	Berg	4:10
9.	"4"	Berg	3:35
10.	"Mer än ingenting" (More Than Nothing)	Berg, Martin Sköld	3:53
11.	"Rubicon"	Berg	4:53

== Personnel ==
- Joakim Berg – lyrics, music, production
- Martin Sköld – music on track 10
- Michael Ilbert – mixing
- Björn Engelmann – mastering

== Charts ==
=== Weekly charts ===
Weekly chart performance for Jag fortsätter glömma
Chart (2022)	Peak position
Swedish Albums (Sverigetopplistan)	1

=== Year-end charts ===
Year-end chart performance for Jag fortsätter glömma
Chart (2022)	Position
Swedish Albums (Sverigetopplistan)	36
