= Jag ser dig =

2012 single by Kent

Single by Kent

from the album Jag är inte rädd för mörkret
- Released: 27 June 2012
- Recorded: Saint-Rémy-de-Provence, France (Studios la Fabrique); Älvsjö, Stockholm, Sweden (Park Studio)
- Genre: Alternative rock
- Length: 5:36
- Label: Sonet, Universal
- Songwriter(s): Joakim Berg
- Producer(s): Kent, Stefan Boman

Kent singles chronology
| "999" (2012) | "Jag ser dig" (2012) | "Tänd på" (2012) |

Music video
- "Jag ser dig" on YouTube

"Jag ser dig" is a song by Swedish alternative rock band Kent from their tenth studio album Jag är inte rädd för mörkret. It was released as the album's second single on 27 June 2012. Prior to its official release, the song charted at number 33 in Sweden.

== Track listing ==
| No. | Title | Music | Length |
|---|---|---|---|
| 1. | "Jag ser dig" (I See You) | Joakim Berg | 5:36 |
| 2. | "Jag ser dig" (Adrian Lux remix) | | 6:42 |

== Charts ==
| Chart (2012) | Peak position |
|---|---|
| Sweden (Sverigetopplistan) | 33 |
