= Kärleken väntar =

2002 single by Kent

Single by Kent

from the album Vapen & ammunition
- Released: 8 July 2002
- Genre: Alternative rock
- Label: RCA, BMG Sweden
- Songwriter(s): Joakim Berg
- Producer(s): Kent, Zed, Martin von Schmalensee

Kent singles chronology
"Dom andra" (2002)	"Kärleken väntar" (2002)	"FF / VinterNoll2" (2002)

Music video
- "Kärleken väntar" on YouTube

"Kärleken väntar" (Swedish for Love Awaits) is a song by Swedish alternative rock band Kent. It was released as the second single from their fifth studio album Vapen & Ammunition on 8 July 2002. It includes the b-side "Lämnar". The tiger theme continues on the sleeve with more photos taken by Jonas Linell.

== Music video ==
The music video for "Kärleken väntar" was directed by Johan Renck and features a young couple kissing and getting physical for the very first time.

== Track listing ==
All lyrics are written by Joakim Berg.

No.	Title	Music	Length
1.	"Kärleken väntar" (Love Awaits)	Joakim Berg	3:59
2.	"Lämnar" (Leaving)	Berg	4:53

== Charts ==
=== Weekly charts ===
Weekly chart performance for "Kärleken väntar"
Chart (2002)	Peak position
Finland (Suomen virallinen lista)	16
Norway (VG-lista)	19
Sweden (Sverigetopplistan)	2

=== Year-end charts ===
Year-end chart performance for "Kärleken väntar"
Chart (2002)	Position
Sweden (Sverigetopplistan)	50
