= Max 500 =

2005 single by Kent

Single by Kent

from the album Du & jag döden
- Released: 9 February 2005
- Studio: Park Studio (Stockholm)
- Genre: Alternative rock
- Label: BMG Sweden/RCA
- Songwriter: Joakim Berg
- Producers: Kent, Stefan Boman

Kent singles chronology
"FF / VinterNoll2" (2002)	"Max 500" (2005)	"Palace & Main" (2005)

Music video
- "Max 500" on YouTube

"Max 500" is a song by Swedish alternative rock band Kent. It was released in February 2005 as the first single from the album Du & jag döden.

The case has a sticker on front with the track list and other details. The CD is black on both sides. Lisa Miskovsky sings backing vocals on "Välgärningar & illdåd".

Max 500 was an illegal nightclub in Eskilstuna in the early 1990s.

== Critical reception ==
Anders Nunstedt of Expressen wrote: "I'm so blown away by 'Max 500' that I have a hard time putting the experience into words. But the new single sounds unmistakably Kent, without sounding like they have before. The production, which hasn't been this dark since Isola (1997), brings to mind the old 80s like The Cult and Sisters of Mercy (without being goth) but the melody is beautiful and the chorus crystal clear (despite having to strain to distinguish certain words)."

Fredrik Welander of Dagens Skiva wrote: "'Max 500' is a good song. It stuck right away when I heard it a week ago. With somewhat the same musical style as 'VinterNoll2', the band brings forth an eerie and cool drive. A melody with guitar and something resembling a xylophone rivets itself and lays the foundation for a characteristic Jocke Berg text."

== Music video ==
The music video for "Max 500" was directed by Johan Renck and features the band in an old log cabin with black ghosts/shadows lurking behind them.

== Track listing ==
All lyrics are written by Joakim Berg.

No.	Title	Music	Length
1.	"Max 500"	Joakim Berg	3:35
2.	"M"	Berg	4:21
3.	"Välgärningar & illdåd" (Benefactories & Atrocities)	Berg	3:43

== Charts ==
=== Weekly charts ===
Weekly chart performance for "Max 500"
Chart (2005)	Peak position
Denmark (Tracklisten)	6
Finland (Suomen virallinen lista)	4
Norway (VG-lista)	1
Sweden (Sverigetopplistan)	1

=== Year-end charts ===
Year-end chart performance for "Max 500"
Chart (2005)	Position
Sweden (Sverigetopplistan)	12
