= Nålens öga =

2006 single by Kent

Single by Kent
- Released: 21 June 2006
- Studio: Park Studio (Stockholm)
- Genre: Alternative rock
- Length: 6:14
- Label: RCA/Sony BMG
- Songwriter(s): Joakim Berg
- Producer(s): Kent, Stefan Boman

Kent singles chronology
"Den döda vinkeln" (2005)	"Nålens öga" (2006)	"Ingenting" (2007)

"Nålens öga" (Swedish for Eye of the Needle) is a song by Swedish alternative rock band Kent. It was released on 21 June 2006. This single was specially written and recorded by Kent for Swedish Save the Children. It was used as signature music for the TV-documentary: "Det handlar om ett barn". The documentary was a co-production of TV4 and Swedish Save the Children to educate about childhood victims of domestic violence. All revenue from the single went directly to Swedish Save the Children. The CD came in a sleeve.

== Charts ==
=== Weekly charts ===
Weekly chart performance for "Nålens öga"
Chart (2006)	Peak position
Sweden (Sverigetopplistan)	3

=== Year-end charts ===
Year-end chart performance for "Nålens öga"
Chart (2006)	Position
Sweden (Sverigetopplistan)	42
