= Trespassers (album) =

Studio album by Kashmir
- Released: 1 February 2010
- Recorded: 2007–2009
- Length: 45:10
- Label: Columbia / Sony Music
- Producers: Kashmir, Andy Wallace, John O'Mahony

Kashmir chronology
No Balance Palace (2005)	Trespassers (2010)

Trespassers is the sixth album by the Danish band Kashmir. It was released on 1 February 2010.

== Track listing ==
1. "Mouthful of Wasps" – 5:16
2. "Intruder" – 4:24
3. "Mantaray" – 4:10
4. "Pallas Athena" – 2:28
5. "Still Boy" – 5:12
6. "Bewildered in the City" – 6:29
7. "Pursuit of Misery" – 4:07
8. "Time Has Deserted Us" – 4:04
9. "Danger Bear" – 3:40
10. "The Indian (That Dwells in This Chest)" – 5:23
11. "Track 11" - Hidden Track - 7:01

== Singles ==
1. "Mouthful of Wasps" (30 November 2009)
2. "Still Boy"
3. "Pursuit of Misery"
4. "Bewildered in the City"

== Charts ==
Chart (2010)	Peak position
Danish Albums Chart	1
Mexican Top 100	89
iTunes Mexico Top 200	25
iTunes Mexico Top Rock Albums	2
