= Kasper Torsting =

Danish film director

- Born: 22 September 1975 (age 50); Viborg, Denmark
- Occupations: Film director; cinematoprapher; screenwriter
- Years active: 2001–present
- Website: https://kaspertorsting.com

Kasper Torsting (born September 22, 1975) is a Danish film director, producer, screenwriter, cinematographer, and editor. He is best known for his early works as a cinematographer and director on the documentaries Rocket Brothers, Solo, and the cinema-portrait of fellow Danish director, Oscar winner Thomas Vinterberg and David Bowie.

== Early life ==
Torsting was born in Viborg, Denmark on September 22, 1975.

== Career ==
He is trained as a director from the Danish Film School's documentary line (1997–2001), and has since worked on a large number of documentaries, which have had Danish and international premieres, as well as music videos, short films and feature films. Kasper Torsting is co-founder of Oure Dox and has taught at the Oure School.

Kasper Torsting made his debut as a feature film director with the “A War Within” in 2018. The film won the ‘Nordic Competition’ and the ‘Audience Award’ at the 34th Santa Barbara International Film Festival, as well as several more honors. Kasper Torsting has directed several major commercials from 2013, alongside his work on documentaries and films.

In 2016 Kasper Torsting produced, with Studio+, a web based mini-TV-series “Ø”, which is a thriller made for cellphone screens.

== Filmography ==
- Den anden side (Documentary) (2001)
- Mr. Vinterberg & Mr. Bowie (Documentary) (2002)
- Rocket Brothers - tæt på bandet Kashmir (Documentary) (2003)
- The Aftermath (Documentary) (2005)
- Solo (Documentary) (2007)
- Vores Krig (Documentary) (2009)
- Krigsminister (Documentary) (2009)
- Søren Gade, de sidste 48 timer Documentary) (2009)
- Udflugt (Short film, Fiction) (2010)
- Armadillo (Documentary, idea and producer) (2011)
- Sex, kaos og bekendelser (TV-series, editor) (2012)
- Piratjagt (2012)
- Ø (Web TV-series) (2016)
- A War Within (2017)

== Awards and honors ==
- 2017 – Jury Award -Best Script for Ø - Shared with Amulya Malladi (writer) - LA Web Fest
- 2018 – Valhalla Award for A War Within- Santa Barbara International Film Festival
- 2018 – Audience Choice Award - Best Feature Length Film for A War Within - Santa Barbara International Film Festival
- 2019 – Jury Award - Best International Narrative Feature for A War Within - Shared with Ronnie Fridthjof (writer) - Rome International Film Festival
- 2019 – Audience Award - Best Feature for A War Within - Shared with Ronnie Fridthjof (writer) - Rome International Film Festival
- 2019 – Jury Award - Best Film for A War Within - Shared with Ronnie Fridthjof (writer)- Fairhope Film Festival
- 2019 – Audience Award - Best Feature for A War Within’' - Shared with Ronnie Fridthjof (writer) - Lighthouse International Film Festival

== Danish awards and honors ==
- 2004 – CPH:DOX Award - Gold Dok Best Sound for Rocket Brothers - tæt på bandet Kashmir - CPH:DOX
- 2004 – Nordic Documentary Film Award - Best Nordic Documentary for Rocket Brothers - tæt på bandet Kashmir - Nordisk Panorama
- 2004 – Jury Special Prize for Rocket Brothers - tæt på bandet Kashmir - Odense International Film Festival
- 2007 – Youth Jury Prize, special mention for Solo - Odense International Film Festival
- 2007 – Audience Award for Solo - Odense International Film Festival
- 2008 – TV Prisen - Best Documentary Series, for Politiskolen
- 2010 – Robert for Best Documentary (Årets lange dokumentarfilm) for Armadillo.
- 2010 – Bodil for Best Documentary (Bedste dokumentarfilm) for Armadillo
- 2012 – TV Prisen - Best Documentary Series, for Sex, kaos og bekendelser
