= Musik non stop =

1999 single by Kent

"Musik Non Stop"

Single by Kent

from the album Hagnesta Hill
- Released: 15 November 1999 (Swedish version); 10 July 2000 (English version)
- Genre: Alternative rock
- Label: BMG Sweden/RCA Victor
- Songwriter: Joakim Berg
- Producer: Zed

Kent singles chronology
"747" (1998)	"Musik Non Stop" (1999)	"En himmelsk drog" (2000)

Music video
- "Musik Non Stop" on YouTube

"Musik Non Stop" is a song by Swedish alternative rock band Kent. It was released in November 1999 as the first single from the album Hagnesta Hill. It includes two B-sides.

The song won the Rockbjörnen award in the "Swedish song of the year 1999" category. A version in English was released under the title "Music Non Stop".

== Track listing ==
All lyrics are written by Joakim Berg.

CD single track listing
No.	Title	Music	Length
1.	"Musik Non Stop"	Joakim Berg	4:35
2.	"Bas riff" (Bass Riff)	Berg	3:33
3.	"Önskar att någon..." (Wish That Someone...)	Berg	3:57

English version CD single track listing
No.	Title	Music	Length
1.	"Music Non Stop"		4:35
2.	"Insects"	Berg	4:10
3.	"About Golden Years"	Berg	2:39

== Charts ==
=== Weekly charts ===
Weekly chart performance
Chart (1999–2000)	Peak position
Finland (Suomen virallinen lista)	9
Norway (VG-lista)	14
Sweden (Sverigetopplistan)	3

=== Year-end charts ===
Annual chart rankings
Chart (2000)	Rank
European Airplay (Border Breakers)	59
