= En himmelsk drog =

2000 single by Kent

Single by Kent

from the album Hagnesta Hill
- Released: 8 March 2000
- Genre: Alternative rock
- Label: BMG Sweden/RCA Victor
- Songwriter(s): Joakim Berg
- Producer(s): Zed

Kent singles chronology
"Musik non stop" (1999)	"En himmelsk drog" (2000)	"Kevlarsjäl" (2000)

Music video
- "En himmelsk drog" on YouTube

"En himmelsk drog" is a song by Swedish alternative rock band Kent. It was released in March 2000 as the second single from the album Hagnesta Hill. It includes the two B-sides "Noll" and "Om gyllene år".

== Track listing ==
All lyrics are written by Joakim Berg.

CD single track listing
No.	Title	Music	Length
1.	"En himmelsk drog" (A Heavenly Drug)	Joakim Berg	4:04
2.	"Noll" (Zero)	Berg	4:32
3.	"Om gyllene år" (About Golden Years)	Berg	2:40

Cardboard sleeve CD track listing
No.	Title	Length
1.	"En himmelsk drog"	4:04
2.	"Om gyllene år"	2:40

== Charts ==
=== Weekly charts ===
Weekly chart performance for "En himmelsk drog"
Chart (2000)	Peak position
Finland (Suomen virallinen lista)	11
Sweden (Sverigetopplistan)	12
