= Den döda vinkeln =

2005 single by Kent

Single by Kent

from the album Du & jag döden
- Released: 31 August 2005
- Studio: Park Studio (Stockholm)
- Genre: Alternative rock
- Length: 4:02
- Label: BMG Sweden/RCA
- Songwriter(s): Joakim Berg
- Producer(s): Kent, Stefan Boman

Kent singles chronology
"Palace & Main" (2005)	"Den döda vinkeln" (2005)	"Nålens öga" (2006)

Music video
- "Den döda vinkeln" on YouTube

"Den döda vinkeln" (Swedish for The Blind Spot, literally: The Dead Angle) is a 2005 single by Swedish alternative rock band Kent, from the album Du & jag döden. It was released without a B-side. The one track single was initially intended to be a promotion single only, but the record company decided to make it an official release.

== Music video ==
The music video for "Den döda vinkeln" was directed by Marcus Engstrand. The video features a collage of material shot during the tour "Turné 19" in 2005, where the concerts took place in huge tents with a capacity of up to 18,000.

== Charts ==
=== Weekly charts ===
Weekly chart performance for "Den döda vinkeln"
Chart (2005)	Peak position
Sweden (Sverigetopplistan)	14
