= Kevlarsjäl =

2000 single by Kent

Single by Kent

from the album Hagnesta Hill
- Released: 4 September 2000
- Genre: Alternative rock
- Label: BMG Sweden/RCA Victor
- Composer(s): Joakim Berg
- Producer(s): Zed

Kent singles chronology
"En himmelsk drog" (2000)	"Kevlarsjäl" (2000)	"Chans" (2000)

"Kevlarsjäl" is a song by Swedish alternative rock band Kent. It was released in September 2000 as the third single from the album Hagnesta Hill.

The single contains the non-album track "Längtan skala 3:1" that was specially recorded for an Amnesty charity album. The two other B-sides are from the English version of Hagnesta Hill that were not recorded in Swedish.

== Track listing ==
All lyrics are written by Joakim Berg.

CD maxi track listing
No.	Title	Music	Length
1.	"Kevlarsjäl" (Kevlar Soul)	Joakim Berg	4:26
2.	"Längtan Skala 3:1" (Longing Scale 3:1)	Berg	6:53
3.	"Just Like Money"	Berg	4:16
4.	"Quiet Heart"	Berg	5:23

Promo CD sleeve single
No.	Title	Music	Length
1.	"Kevlarsjäl"		4:26
2.	"Insekter" (Insects)	Berg	4:08

== Charts ==
=== Weekly charts ===
Weekly chart performance for "Kevlarsjäl"
Chart (2000)	Peak position
Sweden (Sverigetopplistan)	23
