= Hagnesta Hill =

1999 studio album by Swedish band Kent

Studio album by Kent
- Released: 6 December 1999 (Swedish version); 28 April 2000 (English version)
- Studio: Puk (Gjerlev); Ljudhavet (Stockholm); City Recording (Stockholm); Atlantis (Stockholm)
- Genre: Alternative rock
- Length: 62:44 (Swedish version); 63:52 (English version)
- Label: BMG
- Producer: Zed

Kent chronology
Isola (1997)	Hagnesta Hill (1999)	B-sidor 95–00 (2000)

Singles from Hagnesta Hill
- 1. "Musik Non Stop" Released: 15 November 1999; 2. "En himmelsk drog" Released: 8 March 2000; 3. "Kevlarsjäl" Released: 4 September 2000

Professional ratings
Review scores
Source	Rating
Aftonbladet	4/5 stars
Dagens Skiva	8/10
Expressen	4/5 stars
Göteborgs-Posten	4/5 stars
VG	5/6 stars

Hagnesta Hill is the fourth studio album by Swedish alternative rock band Kent. It was released in 1999 (Swedish version) and 2000 (English version). For the English version two new songs, "Quiet Heart" and "Just Like Money" were recorded, and "Ett tidsfördriv att dö för" and "Insekter" were left out. "Ett tidsfördriv att dö för" was later used as a hidden track in the digipak version, where it is called "A Timekill to Die For". This was the second and last English album Kent recorded.

The English version of the song "Noll" called "We Need To Eat" is from an English digipak promo for Hagnesta Hill.

== Track listing ==
All lyrics are written by Joakim Berg.

Hagnesta Hill Swedish version track listing
No.	Title	Music	Length
1.	"Kungen är död"	Joakim Berg, Martin Sköld	4:14
2.	"Revolt III"	Berg	3:10
3.	"Musik Non Stop"	Berg	4:34
4.	"Kevlarsjäl"	Berg	4:26
5.	"Ett tidsfördriv att dö för"	Berg	4:34
6.	"Stoppa mig juni (Lilla ego)"	Berg	6:21
7.	"En himmelsk drog"	Berg	4:03
8.	"Stanna hos mig"	Berg	3:57
9.	"Cowboys"	Berg	5:49
10.	"Beskyddaren"	Berg	4:45
11.	"Berg & dalvana"	Berg	4:48
12.	"Insekter"	Berg	4:08
13.	"Visslaren"	Berg	7:47

All lyrics are written by Joakim Berg.

Hagnesta Hill English version track listing
No.	Title	Music	Length
1.	"The King Is Dead"	Joakim Berg, Martin Sköld	4:17
2.	"Revolt III"	Berg	3:10
3.	"Music Non Stop"	Berg	4:34
4.	"Kevlar Soul"	Berg	4:29
5.	"Stop Me June (Little Ego)"	Berg	6:22
6.	"Heavenly Junkies"	Berg	4:04
7.	"Stay with Me"	Berg	3:58
8.	"Quiet Heart"	Berg	5:25
9.	"Just Like Money"	Berg	4:16
10.	"Rollercoaster"	Berg	4:54
11.	"Protection"	Berg	4:46
12.	"Cowboys"	Berg	4:08
13.	"Whistle Song"	Berg	7:47

* The lyrics contained in "Rollercoaster" ("All those memories will be lost in time/Like tears in the rain") are lifted from the penultimate scene of Blade Runner, as spoken by Roy Batty to Rick Deckard. On Kent's previous album Isola, the band also paid homage to the film, as the song "OWC" stands for "Off World Colonies".

== Personnel ==
"En himmelsk drog" (1999)
Sample of "En himmelsk drog" from the Swedish version of the album

Credits adapted from the liner notes of Hagnesta Hill.

Kent

- Joakim Berg – music, lyrics, vocals, guitar
- Martin Sköld – music on track 1, bass, keyboards
- Sami Sirviö – guitar, keyboards
- Markus Mustonen – drums, backing vocals, keyboards, piano
- Harri Mänty – rhythm guitar, percussion

Additional musicians

- Bill Öhrström – harmonica on track 4
- Jörgen Wall – percussion on track 8
- Peter Asplund – flugelhorn, trumpet
- Joakim Milder – arranged by (strings, wind instruments), conductor
- Kati Raitinen – cello
- Sven Berggren – trombone
- Tony Bauer – viola
- Jannika Gustafsson – violin
- Saara Nisonen-Öman – violin

Technical

- Zmago Smon (Zed) – producer, mixing, recording
- Martin von Schmalensee – technician
- George Marino – mastering

Artwork

- Jonas Linell – cover photo, photography
- Helen Sköld – design
- Frida Engström – girl on the cover

== Charts ==
=== Weekly charts ===
Weekly chart performance for Swedish version of Hagnesta Hill
Chart (1999–2000)	Peak position
Finnish Albums (Suomen virallinen lista)	6
Norwegian Albums (VG-lista)	9
Swedish Albums (Sverigetopplistan)	1

Weekly chart performance for English version of Hagnesta Hill
Chart (2000)	Position
Swedish Albums (Sverigetopplistan)	45
Chart (2023)	Position
Swedish Albums (Sverigetopplistan)	19

=== Year-end charts ===
Year-end chart performance for Swedish version of Hagnesta Hill
Chart (1999)	Position
Swedish Albums (Sverigetopplistan)	34
Chart (2000)	Position
Swedish Albums (Sverigetopplistan)	41
Chart (2002)	Position
Swedish Albums (Sverigetopplistan)	50
Chart (2003)	Position
Swedish Albums (Sverigetopplistan)	73
