= Travelogue (Kashmir album) =

1994 album by Kashmir

Studio album by Kashmir
- Released: 17 February 1994
- Recorded: December 1993 – January 1994
- Genre: Rock
- Label: Sony
- Producer: Poul Martin Bonde

Kashmir chronology
Travelogue (1994)	Cruzential (1996)

Travelogue is the debut album of Danish rock band Kashmir. It was released in 1994.

== Track listing ==
No.	Title	Length
1.	"The Story of Jamie Fame Flame"	3:23
2.	"Art of Me"	4:48
3.	"Rose"	5:01
4.	"Leather Crane"	5:30
5.	"Don't Look Back It's Probably Hypochondriac Jack Having a Heart Attack"	3:36
6.	"Youth"	4:14
7.	"Little Old Birdy Funk Thing"	4:49
8.	"Yellow"	3:38
9.	"Christians Dive"	4:08
10.	"Vicious Passion"	4:15
