= Kashmir (Danish band) =

Danish rock band

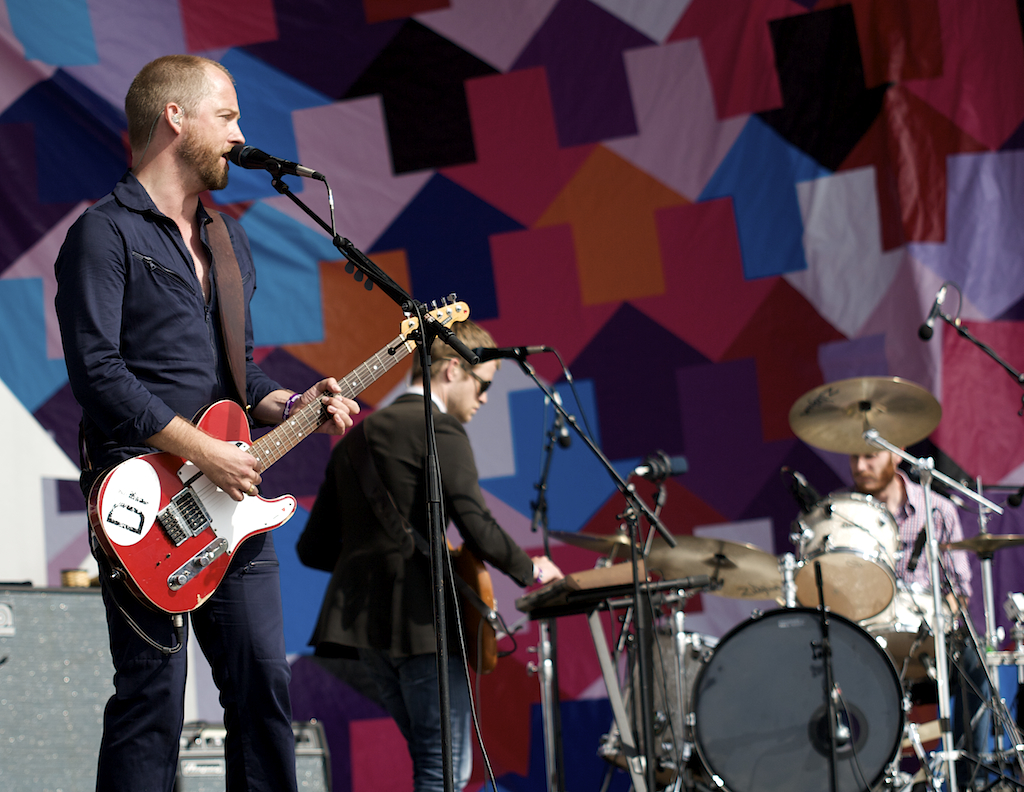
- Kashmir performing in 2009

Background information
- Origin: Denmark
- Genres: Alternative rock, indie rock
- Years active: 1991–present
- Label: Sony Records
- Members: Kasper Eistrup; Mads Tunebjerg; Asger Techau; Henrik Lindstrand

Kashmir is a Danish alternative rock band consisting of Kasper Eistrup (vocals and lead guitar); Mads Tunebjerg (bass); Asger Techau (drums) and Henrik Lindstrand (keyboards and guitar).

== History ==
In the spring of 1991, Eistrup, Tunebjerg and Techau formed a heavy blues band under the name "Nirvana" at Kastanievej Efterskole, a continuation school, in Frederiksberg, Denmark. Shortly after they started performing Thursday nights at Ordrup Gymnasium, a local high school.

When the American band Nirvana started to gain success, they changed their name to "Kashmir", after the Led Zeppelin song.

In 1993, they finished second in "DM i Rock", a national amateur concert contest, behind Dizzy Mizz Lizzy and subsequently became popular in Denmark.

In 2000, the band won six Danish Music Awards: 'Best Danish Band', 'Best Danish Album', 'Best Danish Songwriter', and 'Best Danish Rock Album' for The Good Life; and 'Best Danish Producer' and 'Best Danish Music Video' for "Mom in Love, Daddy in Space".

In 2001, Lindstrand joined the band's lineup.

In 2004, the band won four Danish Music Awards for 'Best Danish Band', 'Best Danish Rock Album' for Zitilites, 'Best Danish Music Video' for "Rocket Brothers" and 'Best Album Cover' for Zitilites.

Their album No Balance Palace (2005), features Lou Reed reciting a poem by Eistrup on "Black Building" and David Bowie who sings a duet with Eistrup on "The Cynic". Additionally, the album was produced by Tony Visconti.

On 13 November 2009, Kashmir released the first single "Mouthful of Wasps" on their website. The band also announced via Twitter that Trespassers, their sixth full-length album, would see its release on 1 February 2010. Trespassers was produced by John O'Mahony and Andy Wallace, and recorded at Jimi Hendrix's Electric Lady Studios in New York City.

In 2017, the band went on indefinite hiatus.

In 2022, the band started a new tour. The tour was planned for 2022, but was postponed due to the COVID-19 pandemic.

== Discography ==
=== Albums ===
Year	Title	Charts				Notes
Year	Title	DEN	MEX	NL	SWI	Notes
1994	Travelogue: Label: Start / Columbia Records / Sony Music Entertainment Denmark; Formats: CD, LP	—	—	—	—	
1996	Cruzential^{[+]}: Label: Start / Columbia Records / Sony Music Entertainment Denmark; Formats: CD, LP	—	—	—	—	
1999	The Good Life: Label: Columbia records / Sony Music Entertainment Denmark; Formats: CD, LP	3	—	—	—	
2001	Home Dead: Label: Columbia Records / Sony Music Entertainment Denmark; Formats: CD, LP	11	—	—	—	
2003	Zitilites: Label: Columbia Records / Sony Music Entertainment Denmark; Formats: CD, LP	1	—	—	—	
2005	No Balance Palace: Label: Columbia Records / Sony Music Entertainment Denmark; Formats: CD, LP	1	—	92	—	
2010	Trespassers: Label: Columbia Records / Sony Music Entertainment Denmark; Formats: CD, LP	1	89	—	85	
2011	Katalogue: Label: Start / Columbia Records / Sony Music Entertainment Denmark; Formats: CD	7	—	—	—	Compilation album
2013	E.A.R.: Label: Columbia Records / Sony Music Entertainment Denmark; Formats: CD, LP (white vinyl)	1	—	—	—	released 18 March

Notes

- ^{+} - Cruzential was re-released in 1997 with two extra songs as Cruzential (Luxury Version 1997).

=== Live ===
Year	Album details
2005	The Aftermath (Live November 2&3, 2004): Label: Columbia Records / Sony Music Entertainment Denmark; Formats: CD, LP, DVD

=== Mini-albums and EPs ===
Year	Details
1991	Child of Kashmir: First demo
1992	Kashmir Cabaret: Second demo
1995	Travelogue: The EP: UK Edition; Label: Start / Columbia Records; Format: CD
1995	The Epilogue EP: Label: Start / Columbia Records; Formats: CD, LP
2003	A Selection of Two Lilies EP: Label: Columbia Records / Sony Music Entertainment Denmark; Format: CD
2010	Extraordinaire EP: Label: Columbia Records / Sony Music Entertainment Denmark; Format: 10" vinyl

=== Singles ===
Year	Title	Charts		Album
Year	Title	DEN Singles Chart	DEN P3 Tjeklisten	Album
1994	"The Story of Jamie Fame Flame"	—	—	Travelogue
1994	"Rose"	—	—	Travelogue
1994	"Art of Me"	—	—	Travelogue
1995	"Travelogue"	—	—	Cruzential
1996	"Bring Back Superman"	—	18	Cruzential
1996	"Prawn's Blues"	—	—	Cruzential
1997	"Gloom"	—	—	Cruzential
1997	"Stand"	—	—	Cruzential
1999	"Mom in Love, Daddy in Space"	27^{[~]}	2	The Good Life
1999	"Graceland"	—	9	The Good Life
1999	"Miss You"	—	6	The Good Life
2000	"Make It Grand"	—	8	The Good Life
2003	"In the Sand"	—	15	Zitilites
2003	"Rocket Brothers"	33^{[~]}	1	Zitilites
2003	"Surfing the Warm Industry"	—	3	Zitilites
2004	"The Aftermath"	9	1	Zitilites
2004	"Melpomene"	16	6	Zitilites
2005	"The Curse of Being a Girl"	9	3	No Balance Palace
2006	"The Cynic" (featuring David Bowie)	2	1	No Balance Palace
2006	"She's Made of Chalk"	8	4	No Balance Palace
2006	"Kalifornia"	11	2	No Balance Palace
2009	"Mouthful of Wasps"	5	1	Trespassers
2010	"Still Boy"	—	4	Trespassers
2010	"Pursuit of Misery"	—	—	Trespassers
2011	"Splittet til atomer"	4	—	Katalogue
2013	"Seraphina"	14	—	E.A.R.
"—" denotes releases that did not chart.

Notes

- ^{~} - Danish Single Chart peak positions for "Mom in Love, Daddy in Space" and "Rocket Brothers" are for the 2010 chart entries.

=== DVDs ===
- Rocket Brothers (2004)
- The Aftermath (2005) - A live concert DVD/CD from Store Vega, Copenhagen. 2–3 November 2004.
- E.A.R (2013) - Special Mexican Edition DVD with the making of the album E.A.R and music videos.
