= Tillbaka till samtiden =

2007 album by Kent

Studio album by Kent
- Released: 17 October 2007
- Recorded: November 2006 – April 2007
- Studios: Allaire Studios (New York City); Park Studio (Stockholm)
- Genres: Alternative rock, synthpop
- Length: 53:21
- Labels: RCA, Sony BMG
- Producers: Kent, Joshua

Kent chronology
The Hjärta & Smärta EP (2005)	Tillbaka till samtiden (2007)	Box 1991-2008 (2008)

Singles from Tillbaka till samtiden
- 1. "Ingenting" Released: 17 September 2007; 2. "Columbus" Released: 5 December 2007; 3. "Generation Ex" Released: 9 April 2008; 4. "Vy från ett luftslott" Released: 2 July 2008

Tillbaka till samtiden (Swedish for Back to the Present) is the seventh studio album by Swedish alternative rock band Kent. It was released on 17 October 2007 in Scandinavia through RCA Records and Sony BMG. The title means "Back to the Present", a pun on the Swedish translated title of Back to the Future (Tillbaka till framtiden).

== Background and recording ==
The band began recording Tillbaka till samtiden in November 2006 in Allaire Studios in New York City. In October 2006, just one month prior to the recording sessions rhythm guitarist Harri Mänty left the band which meant it was "more vulnerable when being one man less, but it has also glued us more together", according to guitarist Sami Sirviö.

In early 2007, the work continued at Psykbunkern/Park Studio, the band's studio. In June they returned to Allaire Studios and mixed the album. The album was produced together with Danish producer Joshua.

Musically, the band were influenced by electronic music artists such as Plastikman, Aphex Twin, and Anthony Rother. Sami Sirviö has said he was "tired of guitars" after recording the previous album, Du & jag döden (2005).

== Promotion ==
In connection with the launch of the album Tillbaka till samtiden, Kent was collaborating with Sony Ericsson. "We received an offer we couldn't refuse," the band said in a press release.

On 17 September 2007, the lead single "Ingenting" was released. Those that purchased a new Sony Ericsson Walkman phone between 10-16 September could get the single 24 hours before the release.

On 4 October, Kent arranged a launch party in Copenhagen. The guests—friends, journalists and a few lucky fans—were treated to an exclusive listen to the album. Kent also performed four songs as well.

On the release day of the album an exclusive Kent limited edition of the Sony Ericsson W910i was launched. The W910i Kent limited edition includes the album, mobile themes, wallpapers, unique ringtones and direct link to mobil.kent.nu. In addition, every hundredth phone was signed by the band. "Launching music also via mobile phones feels like a natural progression," said Kent's manager, Martin Roos.

In an interview, Joakim Berg said: "We are making a music phone with them, and it has been a fun collaboration. We got to be involved in designing the model."

Also on the release day, the band held two album signing events one in Stockholm and one in Gothenburg.

On 18 October, Kent performed "Ingenting" on the Norwegian television talk show Senkveld med Thomas og Harald. Two days later the band held an album signing event in Oslo.

The second single, "Columbus", was released on 5 December 2007 and reached the top five on Sweden top list (Sverigetopplistan). The song's music video was released eight days later.

== Critical reception ==
Professional ratings
Review scores
Source	Rating
Aftonbladet	4/5 stars
Dagbladet	4/6 stars
Dagens Skiva	9/10
Expressen	5/5 stars
Göteborgs-Posten	5/5 stars
Svenska Dagbladet	4/6 stars

Anders Nunstedt of Expressen wrote: "That the songs are more electronic is only part of the explanation. Jocke Berg and Martin Sköld have remixed Kent's songwriting from scratch, without losing the thread or pushing aside the melodies. [...] But it's opening 'Elefanter' that sets the tone, an epic synth fiction in several parts where the melody is constantly building before it finally explodes into a vocoder-enhanced chorus and a rampant laptop beat."

Markus Larsson of Aftonbladet wrote: "On the seventh studio album Tillbaka till samtiden the band's love for dark synthpop is clearer than ever. The sound is very much inspired by Berlin – one of the songs is even named after the German capital – and is dominated by cold synths, bass lines and electronic rhythms. The electric and acoustic guitars keep a low profile. And the song material is, as usual, strikingly strong. Several of the tracks have such obvious melodies and choruses that should be impossible to write in 2007."

== Commercial performance ==
The album peaked at number one in Sweden, number two in Norway, number three in Finland and number five in Denmark. It has been certified double platinum in Sweden.

== Track listing ==
All lyrics are written by Joakim Berg.

Tillbaka till samtiden track listing
No.	Title	Music	Length
1.	"Elefanter" (Elephants)	Joakim Berg	5:21
2.	"Berlin"	Berg, Martin Sköld	4:36
3.	"Ingenting" (Nothing)	Berg	4:17
4.	"Vid din sida" (By Your Side)	Berg, Sköld	4:55
5.	"Columbus"	Berg, Sköld	4:26
6.	"Sömnen" (The Sleep)	Berg, Sköld	4:08
7.	"Vy från ett luftslott" (View from a Castle in the Air)	Berg, Sköld	4:23
8.	"Våga vara rädd" (Dare to Be Afraid)	Berg	3:59
9.	"LSD, någon?" (LSD, Anyone?)	Berg	4:20
10.	"Generation Ex"	Berg, Sköld	4:30
11.	"Ensammast i Sverige" (Loneliest in Sweden)	Berg	8:20

== Personnel ==
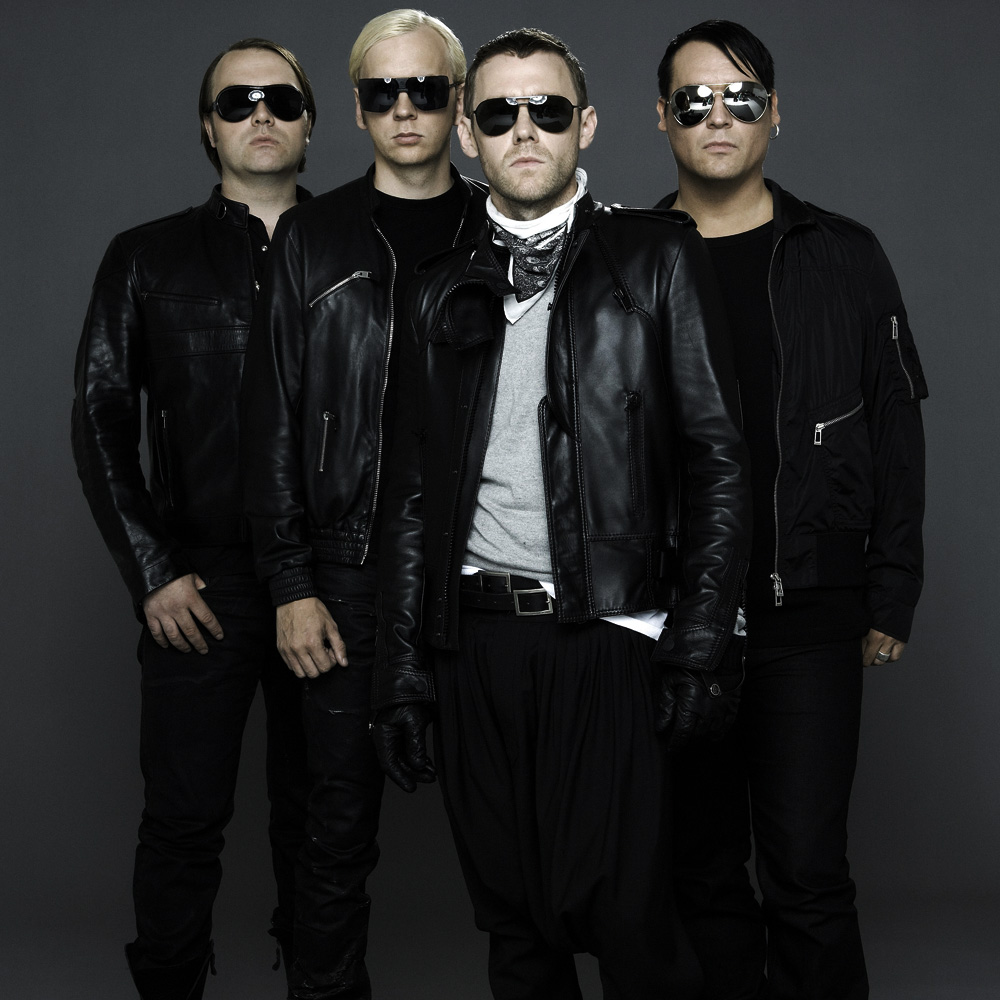
Promo photo of the band from 2007 (from left to right): Sköld, Sirviö, Berg, and Mustonen

Credits adapted from the liner notes of Tillbaka till samtiden.

Kent

- Joakim Berg – music, lyrics, vocals, guitar
- Martin Sköld – music on track 2, 4, 5, 6, 7, 10, bass, keyboards
- Sami Sirviö – guitar, keyboards
- Markus Mustonen – drums, backing vocals, keyboards, piano

Additional musicians

- Goran Kajfes – trumpet on track 1, 8
- Camela Leierth – vocals on track 7, 10

Technical

- Kent – production
- Joshua – production, recording, mixing
- Martin Brengesjö – instrument technician
- Stephanie DuFresne – recording assistant
- Chris Athens – mastering

Artwork

- Jonas Linell – photography
- Helen Svensson – design, photography
- Thomas Ökvist – design, photography

== Charts and certifications ==
=== Weekly charts ===
Weekly chart performance for Tillbaka till samtiden
Chart (2007)	Peak position
Danish Albums (Hitlisten)	5
Finnish Albums (Suomen virallinen lista)	3
Norwegian Albums (VG-lista)	2
Swedish Albums (Sverigetopplistan)	1

=== Year-end charts ===
Year-end chart performance for Tillbaka till samtiden
Chart (2007)	Position
Swedish Albums (Sverigetopplistan)	1
Chart (2008)	Position
Swedish Albums (Sverigetopplistan)	55

=== Certifications ===
Country	Certification (sales thresholds)
Sweden	2× Platinum
