= Zitilites =

Studio album by Kashmir
- Released: 3 March 2003
- Recorded: February–June, September–December 2002 at Petite Machine and Sun Studios, Copenhagen; Sawmills, Cornwall
- Genre: Rock
- Length: 61:52
- Label: Sony
- Producer: Kashmir

Kashmir chronology
| The Good Life (1999) | Zitilites (2003) | No Balance Palace (2005) |

Zitilites (pronounced as 'city-lights') is the fourth album by Kashmir. It was released in 2003. Henrik Lindstrand joined the band as a permanent member on this album. "Rocket Brothers", "Surfing the Warm Industry" and "The Aftermath" were all released as singles and were all hits in Denmark. "Rocket Brothers" especially was a huge hit in Denmark and Latin America.

== Track listing ==
| No. | Title | Length |
|---|---|---|
| 1. | "Rocket Brothers" | 5:26 |
| 2. | "Surfing the Warm Industry" | 4:26 |
| 3. | "The Aftermath" | 4:22 |
| 4. | "Ruby Over Diamond" | 3:09 |
| 5. | "Melpomene" | 4:39 |
| 6. | "The Push" | 4:46 |
| 7. | "Ramparts" | 4:06 |
| 8. | "Petite Machine" | 4:44 |
| 9. | "The New Gold" | 3:40 |
| 10. | "Big Fresh" | 5:11 |
| 11. | "In the Sand" | 3:13 |
| 12. | "Small Poem of Old Friend" | 6:04 |
| 13. | "Zitilites" | 4:01 |
| 14. | "Bodmin Pill" | 3:59 |
