= Vapen & ammunition =

2002 studio album by Kent

Vapen & Ammunition

Studio album by Kent
- Released: 15 April 2002
- Recorded: October 2001 – February 2002
- Studio: Medley Studio (Copenhagen); DHS Studio (Stockholm)
- Genre: Alternative rock
- Length: 45:46
- Label: RCA, BMG
- Producer: Kent, Zed, Martin von Schmalensee

Kent chronology
B-Sidor 95-00 (2000)	Vapen & Ammunition (2002)	Du & jag döden (2005)

Singles from Vapen & ammunition
- 1. "Dom andra" Released: 18 March 2002; 2. "Kärleken väntar" Released: 8 July 2002; 3. "FF / VinterNoll2" Released: 4 November 2002

Professional ratings
Review scores
Source	Rating
Aftonbladet	4/5 stars
Dagbladet	5/6 stars
Dagens Skiva	6/10
Expressen	5/5 stars
VG	5/6 stars

Vapen & ammunition (Swedish for Weapons & Ammunition) is the fifth studio album by Swedish alternative rock band Kent. It was released on 15 April 2002 through RCA Records and BMG. The white tiger on the album cover is a tribute to the band's hometown Eskilstuna: Parken Zoo had white tigers as its main attraction.

Vapen & ammunition was voted Best Album of 2002 on the Grammis awards, the Swedish equivalent to the Grammy. It is the best-selling album by Kent.

In an interview in January 2003, Berg spoke about the great success of Vapen & ammunition: "What exists is a self-confidence underpinned by many years of work, a certainty that we know the art, know the craft, we can redo it and more than that, we can do it better. But that in itself is no guarantee that the commercial success can be surpassed. What happened to us may never happen again. Regardless of whether we make the best album in world history next time. It's not really about that. It's more about timing, releasing the right kind of album at the right kind of time. Last year I kind of had to shake myself up and think: Enjoy! This is maybe once in a lifetime. Maybe this will be the best year of my life. It gives strange perspectives. At the same time, it is a depressing thought."

== Background and recording ==
In April 2001, lead singer Joakim Berg played fifteen new songs on acoustic guitar in his apartment for the other band members. In June, Kent rented a big house in Nantes, France, where the band spent a week recording demos. In October, the band traveled to Copenhagen to start recording a new album. They later went on to record the album in Stockholm as well. In December, they had laid the foundations for nine of eleven songs. They reported from the studio that they had tried to make an album with more radio-friendly songs.

== Commercial performance ==
Vapen & ammunition debuted at number one in Sweden, Norway and Finland, and at number four in Denmark. In 2003, the album had sold over 600,000 copies worldwide.

== Track listing ==
All music and lyrics written by Joakim Berg, except "FF" lyrics written by Berg and Nancy Danino.

Vapen & ammunition track listing
No.	Title	Length
1.	"Sundance Kid"	5:09
2.	"Pärlor" (Pearls)	3:56
3.	"Dom andra" (The Others)	3:46
4.	"Duett" (Duet)	4:42
5.	"Hur jag fick dig att älska mig" (How I Made You Love Me)	5:22
6.	"Kärleken väntar" (Love Awaits)	3:59
7.	"Socker" (Sugar)	5:35
8.	"FF"	4:13
9.	"Elite"	6:05
10.	"Sverige" (Sweden)	2:59

Limited edition – disc 2
No.	Title	Length
1.	"VinterNoll2" (WinterZero2)	4:24

== Personnel ==
Credits adapted from the liner notes of Vapen & ammunition.

Kent

- Joakim Berg – music, lyrics, vocals, guitar
- Martin Sköld – bass, keyboards
- Sami Sirviö – guitar, keyboards
- Markus Mustonen – drums, backing vocals, keyboards, piano
- Harri Mänty – rhythm guitar, percussion

Additional musicians

- Martin von Schmalensee – slide guitar on track 1, acoustic guitar on track 9
- Titiyo – vocals on track 4
- Nancy Danino – vocals on track 8
- Henrik Rongedal, Ingela Olson, Jessica Pilnäs, Niklas Gabrielsson – backing vocals on track 9
- Thobias Gabrielsson – backing vocal arrangement on track 9
- Jojje Wadenius – acoustic guitar on track 10

Technical

- Kent – producer
- Zmago Smon (Zed) – producer, mixing, recording
- Martin von Schmalensee – producer, recording
- Björn Engelmann – mastering

Artwork

- Jonas Linell – photography
- Helen Sköld – design

== Charts ==
=== Weekly charts ===
Weekly chart performance for Vapen & ammunition
Chart (2002)	Peak position
Danish Albums (Hitlisten)	4
Finnish Albums (Suomen virallinen lista)	1
Norwegian Albums (VG-lista)	1
Swedish Albums (Sverigetopplistan)	1
Chart (2025)	Position
Greek Albums (IFPI)	42

=== Year-end charts ===
Year-end chart performance for Vapen & ammunition
Chart	Year	Position
Swedish Albums (Sverigetopplistan)	2002	1
Swedish Albums (Sverigetopplistan)	2003	7
Swedish Albums (Sverigetopplistan)	2005	98
Swedish Albums (Sverigetopplistan)	2015	55
Swedish Albums (Sverigetopplistan)	2016	42
Swedish Albums (Sverigetopplistan)	2017	65
Swedish Albums (Sverigetopplistan)	2018	60
Swedish Albums (Sverigetopplistan)	2021	64
Swedish Albums (Sverigetopplistan)	2022	59
Swedish Albums (Sverigetopplistan)	2024	11
Swedish Albums (Sverigetopplistan)	2025	13

== Certifications ==
Certifications for Vapen & ammunition
Region	Certification	Certified units/sales
Denmark (IFPI Danmark)	2× Platinum	40,000^{‡}
Finland (Musiikkituottajat)	Platinum	57,339
Norway (IFPI Norway)	2× Platinum	100,000^{*}
Sweden (GLF)	6× Platinum	360,000^{^}
^{*} Sales figures based on certification alone.^{^} Shipments figures based on certification alone.^{‡} Sales+streaming figures based on certification alone.
