= The Good Life (Kashmir album) =

Studio album by Kashmir
- Released: February 16, 1999
- Recorded: December 1997 – January 1999
- Genre: Rock
- Length: 49:47
- Label: Sony
- Producers: Joshua and Kashmir, additional production & mix:James Guthrie

Kashmir chronology
Cruzential (1996)	The Good Life (1999)	Zitilites (2003)

The Good Life is a 1999 album by Danish rock group Kashmir, which served to greatly increase the popularity of the band. They changed their musical style from the genre of groovecore as seen in their earlier albums Travelogue and Cruzential, into more soft rock. The group was rewarded with 6 Danish grammys for the album.

== Track listing ==
No.	Title	Length
1.	"Mom in Love & Daddy in Space"	4:32
2.	"Make It Grand"	4:34
3.	"Lampshade"	6:04
4.	"Graceland"	4:47
5.	"It's O.K. Now"	4:52
6.	"Miss You"	4:36
7.	"New Year's Eve"	4:39
8.	"Mudbath"	4:42
9.	"Gorgeous"	6:49
10.	"Kiss Me Goodbye"	4:04

== Charts ==
Chart (2010)	Peak position
Danish Albums (Hitlisten)	38

Chart (2020)	Peak position
Danish Albums (Hitlisten)	6

== Certifications ==
Region	Certification	Certified units/sales
Denmark (IFPI Danmark)	5× Platinum	100,000^{‡}
^{‡} Sales+streaming figures based on certification alone.
