= 747 (song) =

1998 single by Kent

Single by Kent

from the album Isola
- B-side: "Din skugga" "Elever"
- Released: 13 July 1998
- Genre: Alternative rock
- Length: 7:47; 4:25 (Swedish radio edit)
- Label: BMG Sweden, RCA Victor
- Songwriter: Joakim Berg
- Producer: Zed

Kent singles chronology
"Saker man ser" (1998)	"747" (1998)	"Musik non stop" (1999)

Music video
- "747" on YouTube

"747" is a song by the Swedish alternative rock band Kent. It serves as the final song on their album Isola and was released as third single in July 1998. The single includes the B-sides "Din skugga" and "Elever".

It's been recorded both with Swedish and English lyrics. It quickly became a fan favorite, and for six years, the band always ended their concerts with it.

== Name, lyrics and theme ==
In its album version, the song is 7 minutes and 47 seconds long, almost half of that as an instrumental outro with characteristic guitar riffs and keyboard melodies. The title is not to be found in the song, and is not a reference to the Boeing 747 airplane even though the lyrics are flight-inspired: the Swedish original, which is slightly different from the English release, describes the narrator and an unidentified second character leaving or escaping something, towards an unknown destination, on a passenger airliner. It closes with a crash scene, moving into the instrumental outro.

Lead singer Joakim Berg has said that the title of the song matching the length of the song was coincidental and that the band used only two hours to record the song.

The cover image of the Isola album is an aircraft (in fact, a Boeing 737) which was also used as a backdrop in ensuing concerts.

== Music video ==
In January 1999, Kent performed an exclusive show at Heaven in Stockholm. Parts of the music video for the English version of "747" was filmed during the concert. In it, the band is playing on a stage with a picture of an airplane as a backdrop. At the same time, a story is played up about a man who attempts to steal the mysterious contents of a briefcase, but ends up abandoned at an airport.

== Versions ==
- Swedish album version (7:47)
- Swedish single version (4:25)
- Swedish Nåid 2000 remix (4:31)
- English album version (7:47)
- English single version (4:17) - Video recorded

== Track listings ==
=== CD single (Maxi) ===
1. "747" (Single version) (4:25)
2. "Elever" (4:46)
3. "Din Skugga" (4:06)
4. "747" (Album version) (7:47)

The songs "Elever" and "Din Skugga" were later re-released on the B-Sidor 95-00 album.

=== CD in cardboard sleeve ===
1. "747" (Single version) (4:25)
2. "747" (Album version) (7:47)

=== English version ===
1. "747" (English Radio Version) (4:17)
2. "Unprofessional" (Live Radio Session — Recorded for 2 Meter Sessions, 22-5-98) (4:45)
3. "What It Feels Like" (2:41)

=== UK Promo ===
1. 747 (Radio version)

=== US Promo CD ===
1. Radio edit (4:14)
2. Swedish version radio edit (4:25)
3. Album version (7:47)
4. Suggested callout hook #1 (0:09)
5. Suggested callout hook #2 (0:09)

== Charts ==
=== Weekly charts ===
Weekly chart performance for Swedish version of "747"
Chart (1998)	Peak position
Sweden (Sverigetopplistan)	28

Weekly chart performance for English version of "747"
Chart (1999)	Peak position
UK Singles (Official Charts)	61
