= Du & jag döden =

2005 album by Kent

Studio album by Kent
- Released: 15 March 2005
- Recorded: 2004–2005
- Studio: Park Studio (Stockholm)
- Genre: Alternative rock
- Length: 48:22
- Labels: RCA, Sony BMG
- Producers: Kent, Stefan Boman

Kent chronology
Vapen & ammunition (2002)	Du & jag döden (2005)	The hjärta & smärta EP (2005)

Singles from Du & jag döden
- 1. "Max 500" Released: 9 February 2005; 2. "Palace & Main" Released: 4 May 2005; 3. "Den döda vinkeln" Released: 31 August 2005

Du & jag döden (Swedish for You & Me Death) is the sixth studio album by Swedish alternative rock band Kent. It was released on 15 March 2005 through RCA Records and Sony BMG. It is the final studio album to feature rhythm guitarist Harri Mänty, who left the band during the recording of Tillbaka till samtiden (2007).

== Background and recording ==
In 2004, Kent purchased the Park Studio facility in Älvsjö in southern Stockholm. They bought it together with producer Stefan Boman. Kent's first project in Park Studio was the album Du & jag döden. Stefan Boman produced the album together with the band. The studio was nicknamed "Psykbunkern" by the band. The album was created entirely in the studio—from song ideas, writing, and rehearsals to recording and mixing. Kent spent about nine months in the studio finishing it. They had written approximately 20 songs, from which they planned to select 11. In November 2004, the band described the album as "a very dark album."

"We really like it here. It’s good to get away from the city. It was Stefan Boman, who produced Du & jag döden with us, that knew about this place," said Kent's lead guitarist, Sami Sirviö.

The band's previous album, Vapen & Ammunition (2002) became a commercial success, but lead singer and primary songwriter Joakim Berg has said it's not the album "we want to be remembered for". Kent, along with some critics, felt that Vapen & ammunition was some over-produced and according to rhythm guitarist Harri Mänty the band wanted to "rediscover, how we sound". Joakim Berg wanted to distance himself from the verse-chorus-verse based songs from the previous album, saying: "On this album I didn't want those hands in the air, sing along-choruses. Instead, I wrote longer verses, and the places where you think the chorus will come, there is instead often something else", and instead he opted for songs with "a more trance-like feeling".

The title Du & jag döden is a reference to Astrid Lindgren's children's novels Emil i Lönneberga where Emil says "Du och jag, Alfred". As the title implies, death is a major theme of the album, of which Joakim Berg has said: "Many of the songs are about the feeling of immortality, you have within you at the age of 18. Which really is ironic because you are vulnerable especially during that time because life has not hardened you yet. Later you must come to terms with the actions of your past – the years of atonement, I will call them. And then it goes downhill with aging. So when it comes to death, then it is not the exhalation we fear. But the time leading up to it". The theme is most prominent in the song "Mannen i den vita hatten (16 år senare)" where Berg sings "Vi ska alla en gång dö" ("We will all one day die"). Berg has said of the song: "Death and taxes are the only thing you cannot avoid. It sounds depressing when you only hear that line, but the gist is that you should not worry, but do something with the time you have. Everyone is striving toward a goal all the time that seem to be based on some kind of dissatisfaction, no matter how well you are feeling."

== Promotion ==
On 7 February 2005, Kent performed "Max 500" at the Grammis Awards; the lead single was available for digital download shortly after the broadcast, while CD single was released on 9 February.

They also performed "Max 500" on the Norwegian television talk show Først & sist on 11 March 2005.

Between 16-19 March the band held album signing events in Stockholm, Gothenburg, Helsinki and Oslo.

A limited edition of the album was also available. This included postcards sensitive to UV-light, a booklet printed on especially thin paper and a poster with the cover picture, among other things. The limitation was 9,000 items. The album was also available on vinyl, limited to 1,500 pressings.

== Critical reception ==
Professional ratings
Review scores
Source	Rating
Aftonbladet	4/5 stars
Aftenposten	4/6 stars
Dagsavisen	5/6 stars
Dagens Skiva	9/10
Expressen	4/5 stars
Göteborgs-Posten	5/5 stars
Svenska Dagbladet	4/6 stars
VG	4/6 stars

Anders Nunstedt of Expressen wrote: "Songs like 'Klåparen' and 'Palace & main' can, as far as I understand, only come from Jocke Berg's pen. And despite the fact that Du & jag döden falters in a couple of places, the album is proof of strength from Sweden's biggest rock band. Full of integrity, passion, darkness, rock 'n' roll – and hits."

Robert Hoftun Gjestad of Aftenposten wrote: "The last time Kent released a record, the goal was to exclusively make hit songs. It was successful both musically and commercially. This time the idea has been to make a "complete" album, and in that sense they succeed again. Not that the difference is that great, "Du & Jag Döden" is as unmistakably Kent as it used to be. But there is obviously something about the overall sound, something darker and heavier."

Fredrik Welander of Dagens Skiva wrote: "If Vapen & Ammunition were ten singles on an album, is "Du & jag döden" a real album. There is no real single here. I have a hard time picking out the songs that should top the radio charts. There is no disco dance here. Few repeating choruses. Instead, the record is filled to the brim with strong melodies that find their way into me and stick, completely without nagging."

Vidar Tran of Groove.no wrote: "A clear favorite among the 11 songs is 'Klåparen'. It rocks back and forth somewhere between emo and rock, between brilliant lyrics and exquisite melody. Memories from the teenage years resurface. The disco, the prom and not least the girlfriend you never got. The longing is always present. It's sad, but it's also unfathomably beautiful. You can feel the tears pressing on, and the hairs on the back of your neck rise gently in time with the build-up to the melancholic climax."

Bernt Erik Pedersen of Dagsavisen wrote: "Du & jag döden is epic melancholy of the type Scandinavians love."

== Commercial performance ==
Du & jag döden debuted at number one in Sweden and Norway, and at number two in Denmark and Finland. In 2006, the band's manager Martin Roos stated that the album had sold 220,000 copies worldwide.

== Track listing ==
All lyrics are written by Joakim Berg.

Du & jag döden track listing
No.	Title	Music	Length
1.	"400 slag" (400 Blows)	Joakim Berg	4:58
2.	"Du är ånga" (You Are Steam)	Berg	3:51
3.	"Den döda vinkeln" (The Dead Angle)	Berg	4:19
4.	"Du var min armé" (You Were My Army)	Berg	3:30
5.	"Palace & Main"	Berg, Martin Sköld	4:05
6.	"Järnspöken" (Iron Ghosts)	Berg	3:48
7.	"Klåparen" (The Bungler)	Berg, Sköld	5:25
8.	"Max 500"	Berg	3:35
9.	"Romeo återvänder ensam" (Romeo Returns Alone)	Berg, Sköld	4:03
10.	"Rosor & palmblad" (Roses & Palm Leaves)	Berg	4:05
11.	"Mannen i den vita hatten (16 år senare)" (The Man in the White Hat (16 Years Later))	Berg	6:38

- The song title "Den döda vinkeln" literally means "The Dead Angle", but a more accurate translation would be "The Blind Spot", as the expression refers to a driver’s blind spot in a car.
- The song title "Järnspöken" plays on an expression in Swedish, "Hjärnspöken", which literally means "brain ghosts" and refers to imagined problems, from fixations and unfounded fears to paranoia and hallucinations. "Hjärna" is Swedish for "brain", whereas "järn" means "iron", but the two words are pronounced the same way.
- "Romeo återvänder ensam" was renamed at the last minute; when it was presented to the press, it was titled "Som att komma hem" (Like Coming Home).
- The song title "Mannen i den vita hatten (16 år senare)" refers to the fact that at the time of the album's release in 2005, it had been 16 years since Joakim Berg graduated (Studenten) in 1989.

== Personnel ==
"Mannen i den vita hatten (16 år senare)" (2005)
Sample of track 11, "Mannen i den vita hatten (16 år senare)".

Credits adapted from the liner notes of Du & jag döden.

Kent

- Joakim Berg – music, lyrics, vocals, guitar
- Martin Sköld – music on track 5, 7, 9, bass, keyboards
- Sami Sirviö – guitar, keyboards
- Markus Mustonen – drums, backing vocals, keyboards, piano
- Harri Mänty – rhythm guitar, percussion

Technical

- Kent – producer
- Stefan Boman – producer, mixing, recording
- Simon Nordberg – mixing
- Martin Brengesjö – instrument technician
- Chris Blair – mastering

Artwork

- Johan Renck – design concept
- Måns Swanberg – illustration (3d)

== Charts ==
=== Weekly charts ===
Weekly chart performance for Du & jag döden
Chart (2005)	Peak position
Danish Albums (Hitlisten)	2
Finnish Albums (Suomen virallinen lista)	2
Norwegian Albums (VG-lista)	1
Swedish Albums (Sverigetopplistan)	1
Chart (2025)	Position
Greek Albums (IFPI)	42

=== Year-end charts ===
Year-end chart performance for Du & jag döden
Chart	Year	Position
Swedish Albums (Sverigetopplistan)	2005	1
Swedish Albums (Sverigetopplistan)	2025	86
