= FF / VinterNoll2 =

2002 single by Kent

Single by Kent

from the album Vapen & ammunition
- Released: 4 November 2002
- Genre: Alternative rock
- Label: BMG Sweden/RCA
- Songwriter(s): Joakim Berg

Kent singles chronology
"Kärleken väntar" (2002)	"FF / VinterNoll2" (2002)	"Max 500" (2005)

Music video
- "FF" on YouTube

"FF / VinterNoll2" is a single CD by the Swedish band Kent released in November 2002. It was released as the third single from their fifth studio album, Vapen & Ammunition.

The single actually comes with two CDs. The CD is a double A-side in gatefold cardboard picture sleeve. There are technically two covers of the album, and they are connected. The only difference being that one says FF and the other one says VinterNoll2.

The French singer Nancy Danino performs on the song "FF". "VinterNoll2" is featured in the videogame Guitar Hero: World Tour.

== Music video ==
The music video for both "FF" and "VinterNoll2" was directed by Adam Berg. "VinterNoll2" features the band performing in a forest and it starts to snow. "FF" features a spotlight shining on band members and different happenings in the dark.

== Track listing ==
All lyrics are written by Joakim Berg, except "FF" lyrics written by Berg and Nancy Danino.

No.	Title	Music	Producer(s)	Length
1.	"FF" (single version)	Joakim Berg	Kent, Martin Von Schmalensee, Zed	4:12
2.	"VinterNoll2" (WinterZero2)	Berg	Kent, Stefan Boman	4:24

== Charts ==
=== Weekly charts ===
Weekly chart performance for "FF / VinterNoll2"
Chart (2002–03)	Peak position
Finland (Suomen virallinen lista)	10
Norway (VG-lista)	9
Sweden (Sverigetopplistan)	2

=== Year-end charts ===
Year-end chart performance for "FF / VinterNoll2"
Chart (2002)	Position
Sweden (Sverigetopplistan)	23
Chart (2003)	Position
Sweden (Sverigetopplistan)	93

== Certifications ==
While charting in Sweden, "FF / VinterNoll2" was certified gold in 2002.
