= Harri Mänty =

Swedish musician (born 1971)

Harri Kalervo Mänty (born 31 July 1971 in Västerås) is a Sweden Finnish musician and former member of the now-discontinued Swedish rock band Kent. Mänty joined the band in 1996 to replace Martin Roos and remained until 2006. In the band, he played guitar and percussion. Mänty is a music graduate.

Before joining Kent, he was the vocalist for hardcore punk/crust punk band No Security. In 1993, they released the record When the Gist is Sucked from the Fruit of Welfare, the ugly faces of truth show, which contained all that the band had recorded with record label Lost & Found. The band toured Europe, and had an offer to take part in a smaller tour of the US, but never went through with it.

Together with fellow Kent bandmate Sami Sirviö, he has appeared in adverts for the Finnish beer brand Koff.

Mänty told in an interview with SR's Finnish language channel (Sveriges Radio Finska) that he has put his career as a rock musician on the shelf and that he nowadays works as a nurse.
