= Joshua (music producer) =

Danish record producer

- Born: Jon Schumann; 1971 (age 53–54)
- Origin: Denmark
- Genres: Rock, electronic, pop
- Occupation(s): Producer, mixing engineer

Jon Schumann (born 1971), known professionally as Joshua, is a Danish and Swedish record producer and mixing engineer. He has produced for bands such as Kent, Kashmir, Mew, D-A-D and Carpark North.

Joshua produced the 1999 breakthrough album by the Danish rock band Kashmir, The Good Life, which gave him the "Danish Producer of the Year" award at the 2000 Danish Grammy Awards. He produced the albums Tillbaka till samtiden and Röd by the Swedish alternative rock band Kent, released in 2007 and 2009, respectively. For the latter he was awarded "Producer of the Year" at the 2010 Swedish Grammy Awards. In the spring of 2010 he produced three tracks on the band's ninth studio album En plats i solen, released on 30 June. He currently resides in London, UK.

== Selective production discography ==
| Year | Artist | Album | Notes |
|---|---|---|---|
| 1997 | Kashmir | Stand EP | The tracks "Star My Movie, "Could You Kill Fred (Demo)" and "Theme from Skruk" |
| 1999 | Kashmir | The Good Life | |
| 2001 | Kashmir | Home Dead | |
| 2003 | Carpark North | Carpark North | |
| 2003 | Mew | Frengers | The track "Symmetry" |
| 2004 | Claus Hempler | Hempler | |
| 2005 | Carpark North | All Things to All People | |
| 2005 | Mew | And the Glass Handed Kites | The track "White Lips Kissed" |
| 2006 | Cartridge | Enfant Terrible | |
| 2006 | Magtens Korridorer | Friværdi | The track "Militskvinder" |
| 2007 | Kent | Tillbaka till samtiden | |
| 2008 | D-A-D | Monster Philosophy | |
| 2009 | Apoptygma Berzerk | Rocket Science | The track "Green Queen" |
| 2009 | Kent | Röd | |
| 2010 | Kent | En plats i solen | The tracks "Ismael", "Skisser för sommaren" and "Varje gång du möter min blick" |
| 2010 | The William Blakes | The Way of the Warrior | |
| 2011 | The William Blakes | Music Wants To Be Free | |
| 2011 | Guano Apes | Bel Air | |
| 2012 | The Blue Van | Would You Change Your Life? | |
| 2014 | Ginger Ninja | Excess Space | |
