= Joakim Berg =

Swedish singer and songwriter

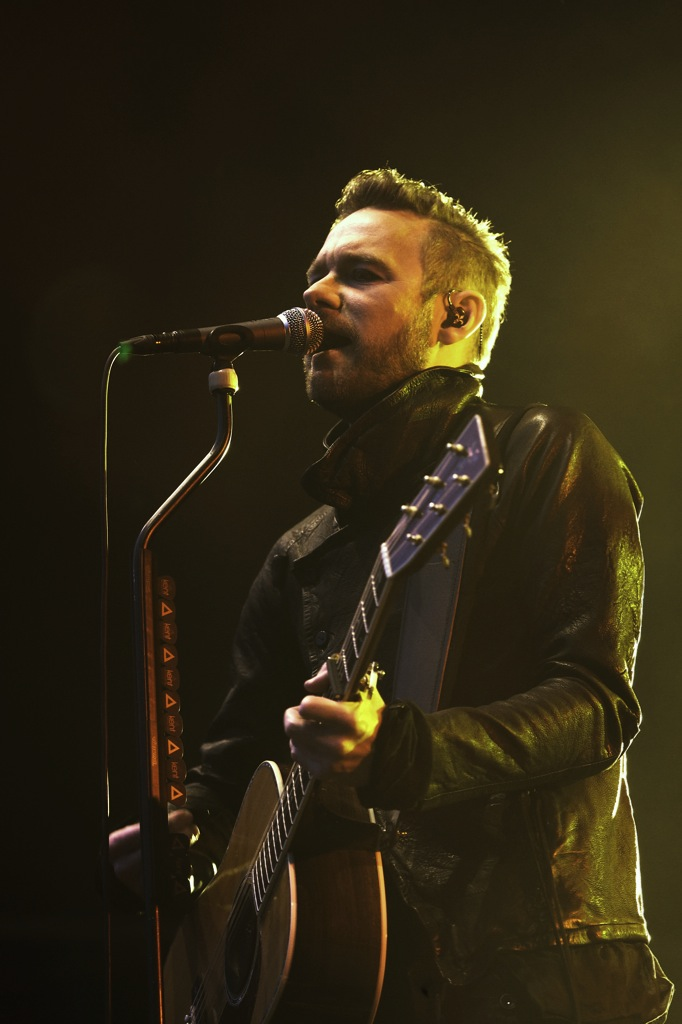
- Berg in 2010

Background information
- Also known as: Jocke Berg
- Born: Herbert Joakim Berg; 16 March 1970 (age 56); Eskilstuna, Sweden
- Genres: Rock; pop
- Occupations: Singer; songwriter; musician
- Instruments: Vocals; guitar
- Years active: 1995–present
- Formerly of: Kent
- Website: joakimberg.se

Herbert Joakim "Jocke" Berg (born 16 March 1970) is a Swedish singer and songwriter, best known as the lead singer of the alternative rock band Kent.

== Biography ==
Berg was born and grew up in Eskilstuna. He moved to Stockholm in 1993 after the founding of Kent, and has lived there since. Berg was the main songwriter, lead singer and rhythm guitarist in the band, which officially disbanded on 17 December 2016, according to the band's official web site. He is the older brother of director Adam Berg, who has directed several of Kent's music videos.

=== Artistic collaboration and side projects ===
Berg has written songs for Veronica Maggio, Lisa Miskovsky, Petra Marklund and Smith & Thell. Besides his role in Kent, he also had a side project called Paus with the Cardigans guitarist Peter Svensson. Paus released a self-titled album in 1998. In 2012, Petra Marklund (internationally known as September) released a Swedish-language record in Sweden; Berg wrote the songs Händerna mot himlen and Sanningen. The record reached the Swedish Top 10 immediately after release. In 2015, Joakim Berg collaborated with Avicii in the song "I'll Be Gone", and debuted on Tiësto's Club Life podcast, and was the first track on December's installment of Avicii's LE7ELS podcast.

=== Awards ===
As a member of Kent, Berg has received 22 Swedish Grammy Awards. The Swedish tabloid Aftonbladet has awarded Kent with 11 Rockbjörnen awards. In 2003, The Swedish Music Publishers Association awarded Berg for the songwriter/composer of the Year. In 2014 H.M. King Carl XVI Gustaf of Sweden awarded Joakim Berg the H.M. The King's Medal 8th size with a bright blue ribbon for his outstanding contributions to Swedish popular music.

== Discography ==
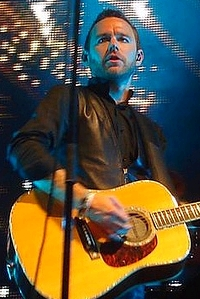
Berg performing in 2008

=== Albums and EPs ===
==== Kent ====
- Kent (1995)
- Verkligen (1996)
- Isola (1997)
- Hagnesta Hill (1999)
- B-sidor 95-00 (2000)
- Vapen & ammunition (2002)
- Du & jag döden (2005)
- The hjärta & smärta EP (2005)
- Tillbaka till samtiden (2007)
- Box 1991–2008 (2008)
- Röd (2009)
- En plats i solen (2010)
- Jag är inte rädd för mörkret (2012)
- Tigerdrottningen (2014)
- Då som nu för alltid (2016)
- Best Of (2016)

==== Solo ====
- Jag fortsätter glömma (2022)
- Framtiden som aldrig blev av (2026)
- Hiraeth (2026)

=== Singles ===
Title	Year	Peak chart positions	Album
Title	Year	SWE	Album
"Sommaren" (with Maria Jane Smith)	2023	53	Non-album singles
"Hösten" (with Maria Jane Smith)	2024	— (Note: "Hösten" did not enter the Swedish Singellista Chart, but peaked at number eight on the Swedish Heatseeker Chart.)	Non-album singles
"Över"	2026	52	Framtiden som aldrig blev av
"Blindgångare"	2026	92	Framtiden som aldrig blev av
"Arkadien"	2026	— (Note: "Arkadien" did not enter the Swedish Singellista Chart, but peaked at number four on the Swedish Heatseeker Chart.)	Non-album single
"—" denotes a single that did not chart or was not released in that territory.

=== Other charted songs ===
Title	Year	Peak chart positions	Album
Title	Year	SWE	Album
"Barn av vår tid"	2022	21	Jag fortsätter glömma
"Begravningsbål"	2022	29	Jag fortsätter glömma
"Aniara"	2022	20	Jag fortsätter glömma
"Låtsasvärlden"	2022	38	Jag fortsätter glömma
"Legender"	2022	35	Jag fortsätter glömma
"Ingenmansland"	2022	48	Jag fortsätter glömma
"Var vi kom ifrån"	2022	54	Jag fortsätter glömma
"Då var allt"	2022	62	Jag fortsätter glömma
"4"	2022	71	Jag fortsätter glömma
"Mer än ingenting"	2022	80	Jag fortsätter glömma
"Rubicon"	2022	86	Jag fortsätter glömma
"Ultraviolett"	2026	— (Note: "Ultraviolett" did not enter the Swedish Singellista Chart, but peaked at number 20 on the Swedish Heatseeker Chart.)	Framtiden som aldrig blev av
"Land"	2026	81	Framtiden som aldrig blev av
"—" denotes a song that did not chart or was not released in that territory.

== Side projects ==
- Paus (Paus) (1998)
- Titiyo (Come Along) (2001)
- Plura Jonsson (Kärlekens Tunga) (2001)
- Stakka Bo (Killer) (2001)
- Lisa Miskovsky (Fallingwater) (2003)
- Freddie Wadling (Drömmarna) (2005)
- Lisa Miskovsky (Changes) (2006)
- Downloading Nancy (Into My Arms) (2008)
- Olle Ljungström (Nåt För Dom Som Väntar) (2008)
- Bilar 2 (Det Känns Perfekt) (2011)
- Erik Hassle (Mariefred Sessions) (2011)
- Adrian Lux (All I Ever Wanted) (2012)
- Morten Harket (Lightning) (2012)
- Petra Marklund (Händerna Mot Himlen) (2012)
- Petra Marklund (Sanningen) (2012)
- Alina Devecerski (Ärligt Talat) (2012)
- Alina Devecerski (Krigar Precis Som Du) (2012)
- Christel Alsos (Let's Pretend) (2013)
- Happiness (All Apologies) (2014)
- Frida Amundsen (Told You So) (2015)
- Ida Redig (Ghost) (2015)
- Joakim Berg & Lisa Nilsson (Innan Vi Faller) (2015)
- Avicii (I'll Be Gone) (2015)
- ADL (Forever Börjar Här) (2015)
- Petra Marklund (Ensam inte stark) (2015)
- Ellie Goulding (Lost and Found) (2015)
- Avicii (Tim) (2019)
- Smith & Thell (Hotel Walls) (2019)
- Veronica Maggio (Fiender är tråkigt) (2019)
- Shylde (Stickly) (2020)
- Eva Dahlgren (Den jag är) (2020)
- Miriam Bryant (Lonely In A Crowd) (2021)
- Ghost (Kaisarion) (2022)
- Ghost (Respite on the Spitalfields) (2022)
- Dead People (We Love) (2022)
- Lars Winnerbäck (Neutronstjärnan) (2023)
- Anna Ternheim (Psalmer från sjunde himlen) (2025)
