= 56th Locarno Film Festival =

Film festival in Locarno, Switzerland

- Opening film: The Band Wagon directed by Vincente Minnelli
- Location: Locarno, Switzerland
- Founded: 1946
- Awards: Golden Leopard: Khamosh Pani directed by Sabiha Sumar
- Artistic director: Irene Bignardi
- No. of films: 27 World Premieres
- Festival date: Opening: 6 August 2003; Closing: 16 August 2003
- Website: LFF

Locarno Film Festival
- 57th 55th

The 56th Locarno Film Festival was held from 6 to 16 August 2003 in Locarno, Switzerland. There were 27 world premieres and films from 17 countries were screened. The festival opened with a screening on the Piazza Grande of the restored print of Vincente Minnelli's The Band Wagon (1953). The Piazza Grande is the 7,000 seat open-air theater assembled in the town square each year. This year it had a 85 by 46 feet screen making it was the largest outdoor screen in Europe. The Leopard of Honor was awarded to Ken Loach for his cinematic career.

The Golden Leopard, the festival's top prize, was awarded Khamosh Pani directed by Sabiha Sumar. The film won 90,000 Swiss Francs (US$66,513) to be split between producers and the director. Both second prize Silver Leopards were awarded 30,000 Swiss Francs (US$22,171).

== Official Jury ==
- Niccolo Ammaniti, Italian writer
- Girish Karnad, Indian director
- Jean-Luc Bideu, Swiss actor
- Frank Nouchi, French film critic
- Nik Powell, British producer and director of UK's National Film and Television School
- David Robbins, American composer
- Stefania Rocca, Italian actress.

== Sections ==
The following films were screened in these sections:

=== Piazza Grande ===
Piazza Grande

English Title	Original Title	Director(s)	Year	Production Country
Alinghi: The Inside Story	Alinghi	Nicolas Wadimoff	2003	Ch
Any Way the Wind Blows		Tom Barman	2003	Belgium
Calendar Girls		Nigel Cole	2003	Great Britain
The Cremaster Cycle: Cremaster 3		Matthew Barney	2002	USA, Great Britain
The Miracle of Bern	Das Wunder Von Bern	Sönke Wortmann	2003	Germany
Die Mommie Die		Mark Rucker	2003	USA
For Ever Mozart		Jean-Luc Godard	1996	France, Switzerland
The Undesirables	Gli Indesiderabili	Pasquale Scimeca	2002	Italia
Holiday		George Cukor	1938	USA
Fellini's Casanova	Il Casanova Di Federico Fellini	Federico Fellini	1976	Italia
The Cost of Living	Le Coût De La Vie	Philippe Le Guay	2003	France
Corn in Parliament	Mais Im Bundeshuus - Le Génie Helvétique	Jean-Stéphane Bron	2003	Switzerland
Jagged Harmonies: Bach vs. Frederick II	Mein Name ist Bach	Dominique De Rivaz	2003	Germany, Switzerland
My Brother-In-Law	Mio Cognato	Alessandro Pepe	2003	Italia
Bread and Chocolate	Pane E Cioccolata	Franco Brusati	1974	Italia
Raghu Romeo		Rajat Kapoor	2003	India
Raining Stones		Ken Loach	1993	Great Britain
The Band Wagon		Vincente Minnelli	1953	USA
A Year Along the Abandoned Road	Året Gjennom Børfjord	Morten Skallerud	1991	Norway

=== International Competition ===
Original Title	English Title	Director(s)	Year	Production Country
16 Years of Alcohol		Richard Jobson	2003	Great Britain
Au Sud Des Nuages	Clouds South	Jean-François Amiguet	2003	Switzerland, France
Bom, Yeoreum, Gaeul, Gyeowool, Geurigo, Bom	Spring, Summer, Fall, Winter... and Spring	Kim Ki-duk	2003	Korea, Germany
Böse Zellen	Evil Cells	Barbara Albert	2003	Austria, Germany, Switzerland
Chokher Bali		Rituparno Ghosh	2003	India
Danehaye Rize Barf		Alireza Amini	2003	Iran
Dependencia Sexual	Sexual Dependence	Rodrigo Bellott	2003	Bolivia, USA
Gori Vatra	The Fire Burns	Pjer Žalica	2003	Bosnia and Herzegovina
Il Vestito Da Sposa	The Wedding Dress	Fiorella Infascelli	2003	Italia
Khamosh Pani	Silent Water	Sabiha Sumar	2003	Pakistan, France, Germany
Les Marins perdus	Lost Sailors	Claire Devers	2003	France
Los Guantes Magicos	Magic Gloves	Martín Rejtman	2003	Argentina
Malen'Kie Ljudi	Malen'kie People	Nariman Turebayev	2003	France, Kazakhstan
Maria		Călin Peter Netzer	2003	Romania
Mister V	Mr. V	Émilie Deleuze	2003	France
Onna Rihatsushi No Koi	Female Barber's Love	Masahiro Kobayashi	2003	Japan
Ora O Mai Piu'		Lucio Pellegrini	2003	Italia
Thirteen		Catherine Hardwicke	2002	USA
Violence Des Échanges En Milieu Tempéré	Violence of Exchanges in Temperate Environment	Jean-Marc Moutout	2003	France

=== Filmmakers of the Present (Concorso Cineasti del Presente) ===
==== Competition ====
Filmmakers of the Present – Competition (Concorso Cineasti del Presente)
Original Title	English Title	Director(s)	Year	Production Country
Adieu		Arnaud des Pallières	2003	France
Baobab		Laurence Attali	2000	France, Senegal
Capturing the Friedmans		Andrew Jarecki	2003	USA
En Ausencia	In Absence	Lucia Cedrón	2002	Argentina
Europe 99Euro-Films2		Tony Baillargeat, Nacho Cerdà, Rolf Peter Kahl, Harry Kümel, Benjamin Quabeck, Richard Stanley, Ellen Ten Damme, Stefan Wagner, Xawiery Zulawski	2003	Germany
Gagooman		Houshang Noorollahi	2002	Iran
Geu Jip Ap	Ginger	Gina Kim	2003	South Korea, USA
Histoire D'Un Secret	Secret Story	Mariana Otero	2002	France
Il Dono	The Gift	Michelangelo Frammartino	2003	Italia
Il Ritorno Del Figlio Prodigo / Umiliati	The Return of the Prodigal / Humiliated Son	Danièle Huillet, Jean-Marie Straub	2002	France
Jött Egy Busz	Came a Bus	Viktor Bodò, Kornél Mundruczó, György Pálfi, Arpad Shilling, Ferenc Török	2002	Hungary
La Nuit Sera Longue	The Night will be Long	Olivier Torres	2003	France
Le Déchaussé		Laurence Attali	2003	Senegal
Los Rubios	The Blonds	Albertina Carri	2003	Argentina
Miso		Kyung-hee PARK	2003	Korea
Mods			2002	France
Mundo Civilizado	Civilized World	Luca Guadagnino	2003	Italia
Même Le Vent	Even the Wind	Laurence Attali	1999	France, Senegal
Nadar Solo	Swim Alone	Ezequiel Acuña	2003	Argentina
Namehaye Baad	Name Later	Alireza Amini	2002	Iran
Nos		Cláudia Tomaz	2003	Portugal
Ramàd	Ramed	Joana Hadjithomas and Khalil Joreige	2003	France, Lebanon
Skinhead Attitude		Daniel Schweizer	2003	Switzerland, Germany, France
Tokyo.Sora	Tomorrow. Sky	Ishikawa Hiroshi	2002	Japan
Toutes-Ces Belles Promesses	All this Beautiful Promises	Jean-Paul Civeyrac	2003	France
Uncut		Gionata Zarantonello	2003	Italia

==== In Progress ====
Filmmakers of The Present - In Progress (Concorso Cineasti del Presente)

Cineasti del Presente / IN PROGRESS
Original Title	English Title	Director(s)	Year	Production Country
A Luz Das Palavras	The Light of Words	Carlos Adriano	1992	Brazil
A Voz E O Vazio: A Vez De Vassourinha	The Voice and the Emptiness: The Turn of Vassourinha	Carlos Adriano	1998	Brazil
Angels Camp		Emmanuelle Laure Antille	2003	Switzerland
Forty Below-A Film Trilogy		Clare Langan	1999	Ireland
Glass Hour		Clare Langan	2002	Ireland
Militância	Militancy	Carlos Adriano	2002	Brazil
O Papa Da Pulp: R. F. Lucchetti	Or Pope from Pulp: R. F. Lucchetti	Carlos Adriano	2002	Brazil
Point De Vue	Point of View	Emanuel Bovet	2003	France
Remanescências	Remnance	Carlos Adriano	1997	Brazil
Suspens	Suspense	Carlos Adriano	1989	Brazil
Too Dark For Night		Clare Langan	2001	Ireland
Vb51		Vanessa Beecroft	2002	France

==== Video ====
Filmmakers of The Present - Video (Concorso Cineasti del Presente)

Filmmakers of The Present - Video (Concorso Cineasti del Presente)
Original Title	English Title	Director(s)	Year	Production Country
Aline			2003	Switzerland
Assenza, Più Acuta Presenza	Absence, more Acute Presence	Paolo Brunatto	2003	Italia
Bologna Centrale			2003	France
Carol Rama Di Più, Ancora Di Più	Carol Rama More, Even more	Simone Pierini	2003	Italia
Chronique Des Love-Hôtels Au Japon	Love-Hotel Chronicle in Japan		2003	France
Flores De Septiembre	September Flowers	Pablo Osores, Roberto Testa, Nicolas Wainszebaum	2003	Argentina
Franco Vaccari. Fuori Schema. 1966-2002 Film E Video	Franco Vaccari. Out of Scheme. 1966-2002 Movies and Videos	Franco Vaccari	2003	Italia
Full House In Malalai		Lech Kowalski	2003	France
Imago-L'Immaginario Di Federico Fellini	Imago-the Imagination of Federico Fellini	Leo Antinozzi, Alessandro De Michele	2003	Italia
Juste Avant L'Orage	Just Before the Storm		2003	France
Le Roi Rodin	King Rodin		2003	France
Madness In The Desert		Satyajit Bhatkal	2003	India
Marguerite, Telle Qu'En Elle-Même	Marguerite, as in Itself	Dominique Auvray	2002	France
Nando, Andata E Ritorno	Nando, Round Trip	Patricia Boillat, Elena Gugliuzza	2002	Switzerland
Portrait Sur Douglas Gordon (Nâ°1)	Portrait on Douglas Gordon (Nâ 1)	Yvon Lambert, Chantal Lasbats	2003	France
Résurrection	Resurrection	Julien Hallard, Guillaume Paturel		France, USA
Skateboard Confidential		Stefano Pistolini, Massimo Salucci	2003	Italia
Tishe!	Quiet!		2003	Russia
Tous Ont Besoin D'Amour [Barcelona]	All Need Love [barcelona]	Arnold Pasquier	2003	France
Tous Ont Besoin D'Amour [Palermo]	All Need Love [palermo]	Arnold Pasquier	2002	France
Trilogie Newyorkaise - Brooklin 02	Trilogie Newyorkais - Brooklin 02	Julien Hallard, Guillaume Paturel	2003	France
Tristano E Tabucchi	Tristan and Tabucchi	Veronica Noseda, Marcello Togni	2003	Switzerland
Valentine		Guillaume Paturel		Fr, USA

==== Video HRW ====
Filmmakers of The Present - Video HRW (Concorso Cineasti del Presente)

Filmmakers of The Present - Video HRW (Concorso Cineasti del Presente)
Original Title	English Title	Director(s)	Year	Production Country
A Kite		Razi Mohebi	2003	Afghanistan
Kabul Cinema	Cemonon	Mirwais Rekab	2002	Afghanistan
Robert Capa In Love And War		Anne Makepeace	2002	USA
Sacrify		Homayoun Paiz	2003	Afghanistan
Sophiatown			2003	Great Britain, Ireland, Africa
The Day My God Died		Andrew Levine	2002	USA
The Murder Of Emmett Till		Stanley Nelson Jr.	2002	USA

=== Leopards of Tomorrow (Pardi di Domani) ===
==== Swiss Competition ====
Leopards of Tomorrow - Swiss Competition
Original Title	English Title	Director(s)	Year	Production Country
Big Shoes To Fill		Michelle Porter	2002	Canada, Switzerland
Blanc-Bec		Robert Nortik	2003	Switzerland
Green Oaks		Ruxandra Zenide	2003	Switzerland
L'Escalier	The Staircase	Frédéric Mermoud	2002	Switzerland, France
La Moto De Ma Mère	My Mother's Motorcycle	Séverine Cornamusaz	2003	Switzerland
Le Dormeur	The Sleeper	Richard Szotyori	2003	Switzerland
Les Tartines	Tartinas	Anthony Vouardoux, Tania Zambrano Ovalle	2003	Switzerland
Maldimamma		Giuliana Ghielmini	2003	Switzerland
Meyers		Steven Hayes	2003	Switzerland
Oscar		Roberto Martinez	2003	Switzerland
Pas De Deux	No Two	Lawrence Grimm	2003	Switzerland
Paul Und Lila	Paul and Purple	Güzin Kar	2003	Switzerland
Petit(S) Cadavre(S) Personnel(S)	Small Personal Corpse (s) (s)	Nadège De Benoit-Luthy	2003	Switzerland
Schenglet		Laurent Nègre	2002	Switzerland
Sunntig	South	Barbara Kulcsar	2003	Switzerland
Viandes	Meats	Bruno Deville	2003	Switzerland

==== Scandinavia Competition ====
Leopards of Tomorrow - Scandinavia Competition
Original Title	English Title	Director(s)	Year	Production Country
Att Döda Ett Barn	To Kill a Child	Björne Larsson, Alexander Skarsgård	2003	Sweden
Boogie Woogie Pappa	Boogie Woogie Daddy	Erik Bäfving	2001	Sweden
Caravan		Dag Mørk	2002	Norway
Contra		Raimo Uunila	2002	Finland
Den Andra Sidan	The Other Side	Korosh Mirhosseini	2003	Sweden
Der Er En Yndig Mand	There is a Lovely Man	Martina Stranska	2002	Denmark
Dykkerdrengen	The Diving Boy	Morten Giese	2003	Denmark
Forfall	Decay	Geir Henning Hopland	2002	Norway
Gråvejr	Gray Weather	Anne Heeno	2001	Denmark
Gömd I Tiden	Hidden in Time	Jens Jonsson	2003	Sweden
Habibti Min Elskede	Habibti My Loved One	Pernille Fischer Christensen	2002	Denmark
Heimat	Hometown	Arild Fröhlich	2002	Norway
Hotel Rienne	Hotel Nothing	Ola Simonsson, Johannes Stjärne Nilsson	2002	Sweden
Houdinis Hund	Houdini's Dog	Sara Johnsen	2002	Norway
Kala	Different	Jonathan Davies	2002	Finland
Keinu	Wave	Jukka-Pekka Valkeapää	2003	Finland
Malcolm		Baker Karim	2002	Sweden
Memphis		Thorgeir Gudmundsson	2002	Iceland
Morgenstemning	Morning Mood	Eva Sørhaug	2001	Norway
Onnenpeli 2001	Lucky Game 2001	Aleksi Salmenperä	2001	Finland
Redd Barna	Save the Children	Terje Rangnes	2002	Norway
Regjeringen Martin	Government Martin	Roar Uthaug	2002	Norway
Risteys	Intersection	Selma Vilhunen	2002	Finland
Tempo			2002	Sweden
Tunnelen	Tunnel	Claus Schrøder Nielsen	2002	Denmark
Viktor Och Hans Bröder	Viktor and His Brothers	Mårten Klingberg	2002	Sweden
Woyzecks Sidste Symfoni	Woyzeck's Last Symphony	Nikolaj Arcel	2001	Denmark

==== Retrospective (Leopards of Tomorrow) ====
Scandinavia Retrospective

Scandinavia Retrospective – Leopards of Tomorrow
Original Title	English Title	Director(s)	Year	Production Country
Att Döda Ett Barn	To Kill a Child	Gösta Werner	1953	Sweden
Bara Prata Lite	Just Talk a Little	Lukas Moodysson	1997	Sweden
Capriccio	Whim	Ole Askman	1967	Denmark
De Beste Går Først	The Best Go First	Hans petter Moland	2002	Norway
De Nåede Faergen	They Reached the Faergen	Carl-Theodor Dreyer	1948	Denmark
Dypets Ensomhet	The Loneliness of the Deep	Thomas Lien, Joachim Solum	1995	Norway
Døren Som Ikke Smakk	The Door that Didn't Taste	Jens Lien	2000	Norway
Eating Out		Pål Sletaune	1993	Norway
Echo		Arnljot Berg	1967	Norway
Elsa		Marja Pensala	1981	Finland
En Förtrollad Kväll	An Enchanted Evening	Per Carleson	2001	Sweden
Familiebildet	Family	Oddvar Einarson	1982	Norway
Flugten	The Escape	Albert Mertz, Jørgen Roos	1942	Denmark
Før Gæsterne Kommer	Before Guests Come	Jon Bang Mertz	1986	Denmark
Gränsen	The Limit	Reza Parsa	1995	Denmark, Sweden
Gömd	Hidden	David Aronowitsch, Hanna Heilborn, Mats Johansson	2002	Sweden, Finland, Denmark
Helgoland		Karin Westerlund	2001	Denmark
Hyppääjä	The Diver	PV Lehtinen	2000	Finland
Härlig Är Jorden	Lovely is the Earth	Roy Andersson	1991	Sweden
Jag Minns Lena Svedberg	I Remember Lena Svedberg	Carl Johan De Geer	1999	Sweden
Karins Ansikte	Karin's Face	Ingmar Bergman	1986	Sweden
Kovat Miehet	Hard Men	Maarit Lalli	1999	Finland
Kristoball		Arild Kristo	1967	Norway
Livet I Danmark	Life in Denmark	Jørgen Leth	1971	Denmark
Lost Weekend		Dagur Kári	1999	Iceland
M.A. Numminen Goes Tech-No		Claes Olson	1995	Finland
M.A. Numminen Meets Schubert		Claes Olson	1997	Finland
M.A. Numminen Sings Wittgestein	M.A. Numminen Sings Wittgenstein	Claes Olson	1993	Finland
Madur & Verksmidja	Madur & Workshop	Thorgeir Thorgeirsson	1967	Iceland
Matka	Travel	Pirjo Hokkanen	1983	Finland
Music For One Apartment And Six Drummers		Ola Simsonsson, Johannes Stjärne Nilsson	2001	Sweden
Människor I Stad	People in City	Arne Sucksdorff	1947	Sweden
Non Stop		Kari Paljakka	1987	Finland
Operasjon Blodsrøyt	Operation Blood Smoke	Bredo Greve	1968	Norway
Pigen Som Var Søster	The Girl Who Was Sister	Pernille Fischer Christensen	1997	Denmark
Reparation		Jens Jonsson	2001	Sweden
Rocky Vi		Aki Kaurismäki	1986	Finland
Siggi Valli Á Mótorhjóli	Siggi Valli on a Motorcycle	Bödvar Bjarki Pétursson	1997	Iceland, Denmark
Stopp	Stop	Pål Øie	1999	Norway, Denmark
Tann For Tann	Tooth for Tooth	Emil Stang Lund	1998	Norway
These Boots		Aki Kaurismäki	1992	Finland
Those Were The Days		Aki Kaurismäki	1991	Finland
Thru The Wire		Aki Kaurismäki	1987	Finland
Tidens Ansikte	The Face of the Time	Elefteria Kalogritsa	2000	Sweden
Two Little Girls And A War		María Sólrún Sigurðardóttir	1995	Iceland
Utukt	Unemployment	Dag Johan Haugerud	2000	Norway
Valehtelija	The Liar	Mika Kaurismäki	1981	Finland
Vokse Opp	Grow	Anja Breien	1967	Norway

=== Leopards of Tomorrow / Filmmakers of the Present ===
Leopards of Tomorrow / Filmmakers of the Present
Original Title	English Title	Director(s)	Year	Production Country
Interface: Cartographie N.3	Interface: Mapping N.3	Pierre-Yves Borgeaud	2003	Switzerland
L'Arrivée	The First Day: The Arrivla	Fernand Melgar		Switzerland
L'Ordination	The First Day: The Ordination	Fernand Melgar	2003	Switzerland
La Rentrée	The First Day: Back to School	Fernand Melgar	2003	Switzerland
La Vente	The First Day: The Sale	Fernand Melgar	2003	Switzerland
La Visite	The First Day: Visit	Fernand Melgar		Switzerland
Le Combat	The First Day: The Fight	Fernand Melgar	2002	Switzerland
Little Girl Blue		Anna Luif	2003	Switzerland, Germany
Mieux Que Rien	Better than Nothing	Julien Sulser	2002	Switzerland
Rekrutenschule Schweiz	Recruit School Switzerland	Kevin Merz	2003	Switzerland
The Greenhouse Infect		Vincent Pluss, Kylie Walters	2003	Switzerland
Voyage Sublime Au Pays Du Gafghanistan	Sublime Trip to the Country of Gafghanistan	Claude Baechtold	2003	Switzerland

=== Open Doors ===
Open Doors - Cuba

Open Doors - Cuba
Original Title	English Title	Director(s)	Year	Production Country
90 Miles		Juan Carlos Zaldívar	2001	Cuba
Amor Vertical		Arturo Sotto Diaz	1997	Cuba
Bendita Tv	Blessed TV	Marcelo Müller	2001	Cuba
Distancias	Distances	Akiko Majima	2001	Cuba
El Ebanista	The Cabanist	Pablo Ortega	2001	Cuba
El Ultimo Vagon	The Last Vagon		2001	Cuba
Gente Que Llora. S.A. (G.Q.L.)	People Who Cry. S.A. (G.Q.L.)	Hatem Khraiche Ruiz-Zorrilla	2001	Cuba
Hacerse El Sueco	Get the Swedish	Daniel Díaz Torres	2000	Cuba
Ilusiòn	Ilusios	Juana Castell Palou	2001	Cuba
La Epoca Y El Encanto De Fin De Siglo	The Era and the Charm of the End of the Century	Juan Carlos Cremata Malberti	1999	Cuba
La Venganza Sangrienta De Kiyoshi	Kiyoshi's Bloody Revenge	Leonor Urdaneta Gallardo	2001	Cuba
La Vida Es Silbar	Life is Whistling	Fernando Perez	1998	Cuba
Madagascar		Fernando Perez	1994	Cuba
Miel Para Ochun	Honey for Ochun	Humberto Solás	2002	Cuba
Nada Mas	Nothing but	Juan Carlos Cremata Malberti	2001	Cuba
Pon Tu Pensamento En Mi	Put your Thought About Me	Arturo Sotto Diaz	1995	Cuba
Tropicanita		Daniel Díaz Torres	1998	Cuba
Video De Familia	Family Video	Arturo Cremata	2001	Cuba

=== Tribute To – To Dürenmatt ===
Tribute To Dürenmatt
Original Title	English Title	Director(s)	Year	Production Country
Der Richter Und Sein Henker	The Judge and His Executioner	Maximilian Schell	1975	Germany, Italia
Es Geschah Am Hellichten Tag	Italy Happened in the Bright Day	Ladislao Vajda	1958	Spain, Switzerland, Germany, France
Hyènes	Hyena	Djibril Kebe	1992	Senegal, Switzerland, France
La Più Bella Serata Della Mia Vita	The Most Beautiful Evening of My Life	Ettore Scola	1972	Italia
Porträt Eines Planeten	Portrait of a Planet	Charlotte Kerr-Dürrenmatt	1970	Switzerland
The Pledge		Sean Penn	2001	USA
The Visit		Bernhard Wicki	1964	USA, Germany, France, Italia

=== Retrospective – All That Jazz ===
Retrospective All That Jazz
Original Title	English Title	Director(s)	Year	Production Country
A Bundle Of Blues		Fred Waller	1933	USA
A Date With Dizzy		John Hubley	1958	USA
A Date With Duke		George Pal	1947	USA
A Great Day in Harlem		Jean Bach	1994	USA
A Man Called Adam		Leo Penn	1966	USA
A Song Is Born		Howard Hawks	1948	USA
After Hours		Shepard Traube	1961	
After You've Gone		Jack Kinney, John Meador	1946	USA
All The Cats Join In		Jack Kinney, John Meador	1946	USA
Anatomy of a Murder		Otto Preminger	1959	USA
Appunti Per Un Film Sul Jazz	Notes for a Jazz Movie	Gianni Amico	1965	Italia
Ascenseur Pour L'Échafaud	Elevator to the Gallows	Louis Malle	1957	France
Aunt Julia And The Scriptwriter		Jack Webb	1955	
Begone Dull Care		Evelin Lambart, Norman McLaren		Canada
Bird		Clint Eastwood	1988	USA
Birth of the Blues		Victor Schertzinger	1941	USA
Bix		Carlo Fuscagni	1991	Italia, USA
Black and Tan		Dudley Murphy	1929	USA
Bosko and the Pirates		Hugh Harman, Rudolf Ising	1937	USA
Broken Strings		Bernard B. Ray	1940	USA
Cabin in the Sky		Vincente Minnelli	1943	USA
Chet'S Romance		Bertrand Fèvre	1988	USA
Clean Pastures		Friz Freleng	1937	USA
Coal Black and de Sebben Dwarfs		Bob Clampett	1943	USA
Dingo		Rolf de Heer	1991	Australia
Dixieland Droopy			1954	USA
Django Reinhardt		Paul Paviot	1958	France
Hallelujah		King Vidor	1929	USA
Hi-De-Ho	Hi-from	Roy Mack	1937	USA
Hi-Ho Broadway		unknown		USA
Hollywood Hotel			1937	USA
I Blues Della Domenica	The Sunday Blues	Valerio Zurlini	1951	Italia
I Want to Live!		Robert Wise	1958	USA
I'Ll Be Glad When You'Re Dead, You Rascal You		Max Fleischer	1942	USA
Il Disco Del Mondo	The Disk of the World	Roberto Malfatto	2003	Italia
Jam Session			1942	
Jam Session			1944	USA
Jamming The Blues		Gjon Mili	1944	USA
Jasper in a Jam		Duke Goldstone	1946	USA
Jazz '34		Robert Altman	1996	USA
Jazz Daimyo		Kihachi Okamoto	1986	Japan
Jazz From Sixty-One		Carl Genus	1959	USA
Jazz On A Summer'S Day		Bert Stern	1959	USA
Jitterbugs Nights		Sid Marcus	1939	USA
Jivin' In Be-Bop			1947	USA
Kansas City		Robert Altman	1996	USA, France
Lady Sings the Blues		Sidney J. Furie	1972	USA
Lambert, Hendricks & Co		R. Leacock, D. Pennebaker	1964	USA
Le Blues Entre Les Dents	Blues Between Teeth	Robert Manthoulis	1973	France
Le Nouveau Monde	New World	Alain Corneau	1994	France
Les Liaisons Dangereuses	Dangerous Connections	Roger Vadim	1959	France
Les Tricheurs	Young Sinners	Marcel Carné	1958	France
Let'S Get Lost		Bruce Weber	1988	USA
Madamu To Nyobo	Madame and the Tomb	Heinosuke Gosho	1931	Japan
Minnie The Moocher		Dave Fleischer	1932	USA
Minnie The Moocher		unknown		USA
Mississippi Blues		Bertrand Tavernier	1983	France
Mo' Better Blues		Spike Lee	1990	USA
New Orleans		Arthur Lubin	1947	USA
New York Eye and Ear Control		Michael Snow	1964	USA
New York, New York		Martin Scorsese	1977	USA
Newport Jazz Festival			1962	USA
Noi Insistiamo	We Insist	Gianni Amico	1965	Italia
Number 11: Mirror Animation			1956	USA
Odds Against Tomorrow		Robert Wise	1959	USA
Paradise in Harlem		Joseph Seiden	1939	USA
Paris Blues		Martin Ritt	1961	USA
Pie, Pie Blackbird		Roy Mack	1932	USA
Rendez-Vous De Juillet	July Meeting		1949	France
Rhapsody In Black And Blue		Aubrey Scotto	1932	USA
Rhapsody In The Wood		George Pal	1947	USA
Round Midnight		Bertrand Tavernier	1986	France, USA
Satchmo The Great		W. Friendly, Edward R. Murrow	1957	USA
Scrub Me Mama with a Boogie Beat		Walter Lantz	1941	USA
Shadows			1959	USA
Shorts From The 40S/50S		unknown		
Shorts With Satchmo		unknown		USA
Snow White		Dave Fleischer	1933	USA
St. Louis Blues		Dudley Murphy	1929	USA
Stormy Weather		Andrew L. Stone	1943	USA
Sven Klang'S Kvintet	Sven Klang's Quintet	Stellan Olsson	1976	Sweden
Sweet and Lowdown			1999	USA
Sweet Love, Bitter			1967	USA
Sweet Smell of Success		Alexander Mackendrick	1957	USA
Swing Wedding		Hugh Harman, Rudolf Ising	1937	USA
Symphony in Black		Fred Waller	1935	USA
Syncopation		William Dieterle	1942	USA
Taksi-Blyuz (Такси-блюз)	Taxi Blues	Pavel Lungin	1990	Russia, France
Texas Tenor: The Illinois Jacquet Story		Arthur Elgort	1992	USA
That'S The Spirit		Roy Mack	1933	USA
The Adventures Of An*		John Hubley	1957	
The Benny Goodman Story			1955	USA
The Connection		Shirley Clarke	1961	USA
The Cool World		Shirley Clarke	1963	USA
The Cotton Club		Francis Ford Coppola	1984	USA
The Fabulous Dorseys		Alfred A. Green	1947	USA
The Gene Krupa Story		Dan Weis	1959	USA
The Glenn Miller Story		Anthony Mann	1954	USA
The Hat		John Hipwell, Faith Hubley	1964	USA
The Hot Spot		Dennis Hopper	1990	USA
The Man with the Golden Arm		Otto Preminger	1955	USA
The Moocher		unknown	1952	USA
The Sound Of Jazz		unknown	1957	USA
The Swingin' Singin' Years		Berry Shear	1960	USA
The Three Little Bops		Friz Freleng	1956	
Thelonious Monk: Straight No Chaser		Charlotte Zwerin	1989	USA
Tiger Rag		unknown		
Too Late Blues			1961	USA
Tschäss	Toddler	Daniel Helfer	1994	Switzerland
Un Témoin Dans La Ville	Witness in the City	Édouard Molinaro	1959	France, Italia
Una Storia Milanese	A Milanese Story	Eriprando Visconti	1962	Italia, France
Uncle Tom Cabana			1947	
Vip'S Boogie- Jam With Sam		unknown	1952	USA
Wholly Smokey		Frank Tashlin	1938	USA
Woodland Café		Wilfred Jackson	1937	USA
Yamecraw		unknown	1944	USA
Young Man with a Horn		Michael Curtiz	1950	USA

=== DIVERS ===
Original Title	English Title	Director(s)	Year	Production Country
Ehrengard		Emidio Greco	1982	Italia
Il Vento Di Settembre	The September Wind	Alexander J. Seiler	2002	Switzerland
Siamo Italiani	We are Italian	Alexander J. Seiler	1964	Switzerland

=== Human Rights Program ===
Human Rights Program (Filmmakers of the Present CdP)
Original title	English title	Director(s)	Year	Production country
Marsho	Gear	Murad Mazaev		Georgia, Netherlands
O Dromos Pros Tin Dissi	The Road to the Bill	Kyriakos Katzourakis		Greece
Human Rights Program
Original Title	English Title	Director(s)	Year	Production Country
5 To Five Kabul City		Eileen Hofer	2002	Switzerland
A Great Wonder		Kim Shelton	2003	USA
Aamer E Nasser		Fadhil	2003	
Afghan Massacre, The Convoy Of Death		Jamie Doran	2002	Uk
Baghdad On/Off		Saad Salman	2002	France
Beirut-Baghdad	Phased	Bassem Fayad	2003	Lb
Botosani, Ospedale Di Neomatologia Di S.Maria (Romania)	Botosani, Hospital of Neonatology of S.Maria (Romania)	Mike Stauss	2003	Switzerland
Brother Outsider:The Life Of Bayard Rustin		Nancy Kates, Barnett Singer	2002	USA
De Engel Komt Terug (L'Ange Revient)	The Angel Comes Back (L'Ange Revient)	Jacqueline Bakker	2002	Nl
Hack Workers		Furkat Yavkalkhodzhaev	2003	Uz
Haram		Gudrun Torrubia	2003	Ye
Intihar (Suicide)		Eliane Raheb	2003	Lb
Invisible		Liana Jakeli	2003	Ge
Jenin Jenin		Muhammad Bacri	2002	Palestine
L'Acqua Che Non C'È	The Water that is not There	Alessandra Speciale	2002	Bf, Italy
Le Siege	Le Victory	Samir Abdallah	2003	
Like Twenty Impossibles		Annemarie Jacir	2003	Palestine
Live Containers		Orzu Sharipov	2003	Tj
Marratan Ochra ...	Stripes Ochra ...	Ismail El Habbash, Najwa Najjar, Abdel Salam Shehadeh, Nada Yaser	2003	Palestine
My Flesh and Blood		Jonathan Karsh	2003	Ca
Ni Olvido Ni Perdon	Neither Forget nor Forgive	Richard Dindo	2003	Switzerland
Nous Avons Tué Pour Rien	We Killed for Nothing	François Margolin	2003	France
Palestine For Dummies		Sobhi Al Zobaidi	2003	
Power: Feminine Gender		Vlad Gello, Nina Rudic	2003	Ua
Prisoners Of The Caucasus		Yuri Khashavatski	2002	Belarus, Poland
Red Butterflies Where Two Springs Merge		Gaukhar/dilia Sydykova/ruzieva	2002	Kg
Return To Kandahar		Paul Jay	2003	Ca
Salaam Viterbo		Maghed El Mehedy	2002	Italy
Schreiben Gegen Den Tod	Writing Against Death	Dominique Robb	2002	Switzerland
Silk Patterns		Uranchimeg Nansalmaa	2003	Mn
Sulle Tracce Del Gatto	On the Trail of the Cat	Andrea Caccia, Vittorio Moroni	2003	Italy
Tarifa Traffic		Joakim Demmer	2003	Ch, De, Es
The Hole In The Wall		Gil Rossellini	2002	Italy
To Kill a Mockingbird		Robert Mulligan	1962	
To Sarah		Nadyne El Khouri Aoudeh, Zeina Sfeir	2003	Lb, Emirates
Tomorrow Will Be Better		Monika Juozapaviciute	2003	Lt
Volver A Vernos	See Us Again		2002	De
War Game		Dave Unwin	2002	England
Wishing For Seven Sons And One Daughter		Ali-isa Djabbarov	2002	Az
Words On Water		Sanjay Kak	2002	

=== In Progress ===
Original Title	English Title	Director(s)	Year	Production Country
120 Mt. S.L.M.		Giuseppe Baresi	2002	Italy
Alice In Wonderland		Gentian Shkurti	1999	
Aliénations	Alienations	Atsuhiko Watanabe	2003	Algérie
Aya		Annelies Strba	2003	Ch
Balkan Identity-The Bride		Erzen Shkololli	2001	
Big Time		Damir Niksic	2002	
Broadway by Light		William Klein	1958	USA
Cada Respiro	Each Breath	Glenda León	2003	
Chambre Avec Vue	Room with a View	Maja Bajevic	2003	
Chamonix		Valérie Mréjen	2002	
Communausme	Community	Vincent Voillat	2003	
Contacts		William Klein	1986	USA
Cremaster 1		Matthew Barney	1995	Uk
Cremaster 2		Matthew Barney	1999	Uk
Cremaster 4		Matthew Barney	1994	Uk
Cremaster 5		Matthew Barney	1997	Uk
Double Bubble		Maja Bajevic	2001	
El Hogar Y Sus Fantasias	The Home and Its Fantasies		2003	
El Télon	The Télon	Orlando Galloso	2002	
Emn 40			2003	Italy
Fermo Del Tempo	Stop of Time	Mauro Santini	2003	Italy
Hey You...		Erzen Shkololli	2002	
Hollywar		Damir Niksic	2002	
Kajsa		Jérôme Thomas	2003	
L'Histoire De Mon Oncle Racontée Par Mon Père	The Story of My Uncle Told by My Father	Alexandra Mélot	2003	
Les Histoires De La Tache 1	The Stories of the Stain 1	Marie Laure Cazin	2003	
Memoria Y Caché	Memory and Cache	Eduardo Moltó	2003	
Milka		Sokol Beqiri	1999	
New York 2001		Annelies Strba	2001	Ch
New York, New York		Sokol Beqiri	2001	
Oblivia	Oblivion	Luca Infascelli, Carlo Lavagna, Caterina Nelli	2003	Italia
Operation Reussie N. X		Orlan	1994	France
Paris		Annelies Strba	2000	Ch
Petite Memoire	Small Memory	Mauro Santini	2003	Italy
Ruines	Ruins	Jérôme Fihey	2002	
Sensory Adaption		Damir Niksic	2002	
Streetparade 1		Annelies Strba	2001	Ch
Tokyo		Annelies Strba	2003	Ch
Undo Disable		Abel Milanés	2002	
Vad	What	Noëlle Pujol	2003	
Women At Work-Under Construction		Maja Bajevic	1999	
Women At Work-Washing Up		Maja Bajevic	2001	

=== Video Competition ===
Original Title	English Title	Director(s)	Year	Production Country
11.22.03 Backstage		Nicolo Massazza	2003	Italia
A Moth And A Butterfly		Gilbert Kwong	2003	Canada
Abel Ferrara: Not Guilty		Rafi Pitts	2003	France
Ball Lightning		Amy Glazer	2003	USA
Camera Gun		Lech Kowalski	2003	France
Cantata De Las Cosas Solas	Cantata of Things Alone	Willi Behnisch	2003	Argentina
Casting		Goran Radovanovic	2003	Serbia
Christmas		Gregory King	2003	New Zealand
Erkennen Und Verfolgen	Recognize and Follow	Harun Farocki	2003	Germany
Genève-Marseille	Geneva-Marseille	Frédéric Choffat	2003	Switzerland
Ixième, Journal D'Un Prisonnier	IXIth, Journal of a Prisoner	Pierre-Yves Borgeaud	2003	Switzerland
Jesus, Du Weisst (Video Version)	Jesus, you Know (Video Version)	Ulrich Seidl	2003	Austria
La Situazione	The Situation	Johannes Hiroshi Nakajima	2003	Italia
Mercado Do Bolhão	Bolhão Market	Renata Sancho	2003	Portugal
Mes Toits Et Moi	My Roofs and Me	Anne Morin	2003	France
Morte Densa	Dense Death	Kiko Goifman	2003	Brazil
Roy Höllsdotter Live		Matthew Saville	2002	Australia
Soleils D' Hiver	Winter Suns	Emmanuel Saada	2002	France
Xiang Huo - Incense	X Ian GH UO - Incense	Ning Hao	2003	China

== Independent Sections ==
=== Critics Week ===
The Semaine de la Critique is an independent section, created in 1990 by the Swiss Association of Film Journalists in partnership with the Locarno Film Festival.

Original Title	English Title	Director(s)	Year	Production Country
Bilder Finden	Find Pictures		2002	Germany
Dix-Sept Ans	Seventeen	Didier Nion	2003	France
Go West, Young Man		Peter Delpeut, Mart Dominicus	2003	Netherlands
Hans Im Glück - Von Einem, Der Auszog, Das Rauchen Loszuwerden	Hans Im Glück - From Someone Who Moved Out to Get Rid of Smoking	Peter Liechti	2003	Switzerland
Peter Sellers Story: As He Filmed It		Peter Lydon, Anthony Wall	2002	Great Britain
The Other Final- Bhutan Versus Montserrat		Johan Kramer	2002	Netherlands
The Weather Underground		Sam Green	2003	USA

=== Swiss ===
Swiss Cinema Rediscovered
Original Title	English Title	Director(s)	Year	Production Country
Fräulein Huser	Miss Huser	Leonard Steckel	1940	Switzerland
La Vocation D'André Carel		Jean Choux	1925	Switzerland
Tessiner Herbstlied	Ticino Autumn Song	Herbert Dreyer	1935	De

=== Appellation Swiss ===
Original Title	English Title	Director(s)	Year	Production Country
Des Épaules Solides	Solid Shoulders	Ursula Meier	2002	Switzerland, France, Belgium
Die Wägsten Und Besten Des Landes	They are Waving and the Best in the Country	Matthias von Gunten	2003	Switzerland
Dieter Roth		Edith Jud	2003	Switzerland
Einspruch Iii	Objection III	Rolando Colla	2002	Switzerland
Elisabeth Kübler-Ross - Dem Tod Ins Gesicht Sehen	Elisabeth Kübler -Ross - Look in the Face of Death	Stefan Haupt	2002	Switzerland
Fremds Land	Foreign Country	Luke Gasser	2003	Switzerland, USA
Mani Matter - Warum Syt Dir So Truurig?	Mani Matter - Why Do you Syntify you so Truurig?	Friedrich Kappeler	2002	Switzerland
Mission En Enfer	Mission in Hell	Frédéric Gonseth	2003	Switzerland
Mutter		Miklós Gimes	2002	Switzerland
Viaggio A Misterbianco	Journey to Misterbianco	Paolo Poloni	2003	Switzerland

== Official Awards ==
=== International Competition ===
- Golden Leopard: Khamosh Pani directed by Sabiha Sumar
- Silver Leopard: Thirteen directed by Catherine Hardwicke, Gori Vatra directed by Pjer Zalica
- Special Jury Prize: Maria directed by Calin Netzer
- Leopard for Best Actress: Holly Hunter in THIRTEEN, Diana Dumbrava in MARIA, Kirron Kher in KHAMOSH PANI
- Leopard for Best Actor: Serban Ionescu in MARIA
- Special Jury Mention: Onna Rihatsushi No Koi directed by Masahiro Kobayashi, Danehaye Rize Barf directed by Alireza Amini

=== Piazza Grande ===
- Prix du Public UBS: Das Wunder Von Bern directed by Sönke Wortmann

=== Leopards of Tomorrow competition ===
- Golden Leopard, SRG SSR idée Suisse Prize, New Swiss Talents: L'ESCALIER directed by Frédéric Mermoud
- Silver Leopard, Eastman Kodak Company Prize, New Swiss Talents: Le Dormeur directed by Richard Szotyori
- "Action Light" Prize, New Swiss Talents: Meyers directed by Steven Hayes
- Golden Leopard, SRG SSR Idée Suisse Prize, Scandinavian Films: Viktor Och Hans BRÖDER directed by Mårten Klingberg
- Silver Leopard, Eastman Kodak Company Prize, scandinavian Films: Onnenpeli 2001 directed by Aleksi Salmenperä
- Film und Video Subtitling Prize, scandinavian Films: Heimat directed by Arild Fröhlich

=== "Cinema e Gioventù" – Leopards of Tomorrow Jury ===
- Youth Jury Prize, short films, "Scandinavia" Competition: Regjeringen Martin directed by Roar Uthaug
- Special Mention, Youth Jury, short films, "Scandinavia" Competition: Tunnelen directed by Claus Schrøder Nielsen
- Youth Jury Prize, short films, "Switzerland" Competition: Viandes directed by Bruno Deville
- Special Mention, Youth Jury, short films, "Switzerland" Competition: Schenglet directed by Laurent Nègre

=== Video Competition Jury ===
- Golden Leopard, Video C.P Company, Video Jury: Cantata De Las Cosas Solas directed by Willi Behnisch, IXIÈME, JOURNAL D'UN PRIONNIER directed by Pierre-Yves Borgeaud
- Special Mention, Video Jury: Erkennen Und Verfolgen directed by Harun Farocki

=== Ecumenical Jury ===
- Oecumenical Jury Prize: Khamosh Pani

=== CICAE – Art & Essai Award Jury ===
- CICAE Jury Prize: Bom, Yeoreum, Gaeul, Gyeowool, Guerigo, Bom directed by Ki-duk Kim
- Special Mention, CICAE Jury: Gori Vatra directed by Pjer Zalica

=== NETPAC (Network for the Promotion of Asian Cinema) Jury ===
- NETPAC Prize: Bom, Yeoreum, Gaeul, Gyeowool, Guerigo, Bom directed by Ki-duk Kim

=== Youth Jury ===
- First Prize, Youth Jury: Bom, Yeoreum, Gaeul, Gyeowool, Guerigo, Bom directed by Ki-duk Kim
- Second Prize, Youth Jury: Au Sud Des Nuages directed by Jean-Francois Amiguet
- Third Prize, Youth Jury: Gori Vatra directed by Pjer Zalica
- Special Prize "The environnement is the quality of life": Danehaye Rize Barf directed by Alireza Amini
- Special Mention, Youth Jury: Maria directed by Calin Netzer, Khamosh Pani directed by Sabiha Sumar

=== FICC Jury ===
- Don Quijote Prize: Bom, Yeoreum, Gaeul, Gyeowool, Guerigo, Bom directed by Ki-duk Kim
- Special Mention, FICC Jury: Les Marins Perdus directed by Claire Devers

=== SRG SSR idée suisse | Semain de la critique Award ===
- SSR SRG idée Suisse Prize, Critics Week: The Weather Underground directed by Sam Green
