= Lifelines (A-ha album) =

Studio album by a-ha
- Released: 24 April 2002
- Recorded: June 2001 – January 2002
- Genre: Pop rock; synth-pop
- Length: 61:34
- Label: WEA
- Producer: Ian Caple; Stephen Hague; Martin Landquist; Clive Langer; Alan Winstanley

A-ha chronology
Minor Earth Major Sky (2000)	Lifelines (2002)	Analogue (2005)

Singles from Lifelines
- 1. "Forever Not Yours" Released: 2 April 2002; 2. "Lifelines" Released: 8 July 2002; 3. "Did Anyone Approach You?" Released: 30 September 2002

Professional ratings
Review scores
Source	Rating
AllMusic	link
The Encyclopedia of Popular Music	3/5 stars
Groove.no	4/7 link
musicOMH	Positive link
PopMatters	Positive link

Lifelines is the seventh studio album by the Norwegian synth-pop band A-ha, released on 24 April 2002 by WEA. The album topped the charts in Norway and Germany, and reached the top 10 in Austria, Denmark, Poland and Switzerland. In 2019, Lifelines and Minor Earth Major Sky, both of A-ha's albums recorded for Warner Music Germany, were remastered and re-released with an extra disc, which contained demos, early versions and alternate mixes. They also received their first official vinyl releases.

== Singles and videos ==
The video for the single "Forever Not Yours" was shot in Havana, Cuba. It was directed by Harald Zwart (who also directed the "Velvet" video) and the storyline is based on the story of Noah's Ark and today's celebrities. Look-alikes of Desmond Tutu, Madonna and Queen Elizabeth II are included, among others.

The video for the single "Lifelines" uses segments from the 1991 short film Året gjennom Børfjord, also known as A Year Along the Abandoned Road. In the short film a camera moves through a small village in Finnmark, Norway, while the seasons change.

== Cover art ==
The cover for the album was made by Andy Frank during the shooting of the music video for "Forever Not Yours" in Havana. It is an edited image of Jose Marti Parque Stadium. In the booklet there are also images of old theatres and old American cars as well as other views which can be found on the streets of Havana.

== Track listing ==
Standard version
No.	Title	Lyrics	Music	Producer(s)	Length
1.	"Lifelines"	Magne Furuholmen	Furuholmen	Martin Landquist, Stephen Hague	4:17
2.	"You Wanted More"	Furuholmen	Furuholmen, Morten Harket	Landquist, Hague	3:39
3.	"Forever Not Yours"	Harket, Ole Sverre-Olsen	Furuholmen, Harket	Hague, Landquist	4:06
4.	"There's a Reason for It"	Paul Waaktaar-Savoy	Waaktaar-Savoy	Ian Caple	4:21
5.	"Time & Again"	Waaktaar-Savoy	Waaktaar-Savoy	Waaktaar-Savoy	5:03
6.	"Did Anyone Approach You?"	Waaktaar-Savoy	Waaktaar-Savoy	Tore Johansson	4:10
7.	"Afternoon High"	Waaktaar-Savoy	Waaktaar-Savoy	Clive Langer, Alan Winstanley	4:30
8.	"Oranges on Appletrees"	Furuholmen	Furuholmen, Harket	Langer, Winstanley, Hague^{[a]}	4:16
9.	"A Little Bit"	Waaktaar-Savoy	Waaktaar-Savoy	Ian Caple	4:10
10.	"Less Than Pure"	Waaktaar-Savoy	Waaktaar-Savoy	Ian Caple	4:13
11.	"Turn the Lights Down"	Furuholmen, Harket	Furuholmen, Harket	Landquist, Hague	4:14
12.	"Cannot Hide"	Harket, Sverre-Olsen	Harket, Landquist	Landquist	3:19
13.	"White Canvas"	Furuholmen	Furuholmen	Landquist	3:27
14.	"Dragonfly"	Furuholmen	Furuholmen	Langer, Winstanley	3:19
15.	"Solace"	Furuholmen	Furuholmen	Ian Caple	4:20

Deluxe edition (bonus tracks)
No.	Title	Length
16.	"Did Anyone Approach You" (Tore Johansen Mix)	5:56
17.	"Time and Again" (Langer & Wainstanley Version)	5:47

Russian version (bonus tracks)
No.	Title	Length
16.	"Minor Earth - Major Sky" (ATB mix)	5:47
17.	"Velvet" (De-PHAZZ mix)	3:47

Japanese version (bonus tracks)
No.	Title	Length
16.	"Differences" (original demo)	2:47
17.	"Hunting High and Low" (Live in Oslo)	7:07
18.	"Manhattan Skyline" (Live in Oslo)	6:14

2019 deluxe edition (disc two)
No.	Title	Length
1.	"Lifelines (Demo)"	5:16
2.	"You Wanted More (Demo)"	4:01
3.	"Forever Not Yours (Demo)"	4:12
4.	"There's a Reason for It (Demo)"	4:14
5.	"The Breakers"	3:26
6.	"Time & Again (Demo)"	5:11
7.	"Did Anyone Approach You? (Demo)"	4:02
8.	"Afternoon High (Original Demo)"	4:39
9.	"Oranges on Appletrees (Early Mix)"	4:00
10.	"Sole Survivor"	4:07
11.	"Less Than Pure (Demo)"	4:18
12.	"To Show It Is To Blow It (Demo)"	4:10
13.	"Turn The Lights Down (Demo)"	4:01
14.	"Cannot Hide (Demo)"	3:14
15.	"There's a Reason for It (A Break in the Clouds)"	4:15
16.	"One in a Million (Early Version of White Canvas)"	2:46
17.	"Dragonfly (Demo)"	3:32
18.	"Solace (Early Version)"	4:12
19.	"Differences (Original Demo)"	2:48

=== Notes ===
- ^{^[a]} signifies an additional producer
- The Russian version of the album contains an introduction spoken by Morten Harket in Russian.

== Personnel ==
A-ha

- Morten Harket – vocals
- Magne Furuholmen – keyboards
- Paul Waaktaar-Savoy – guitars

Additional musicians

- Martin Landquist – additional instruments (1, 12, 13), additional loops (4)
- Sven Lindvall – bass guitar (1, 2, 3, 7, 8, 11, 13, 14)
- Jørun Bøgeberg – bass guitar (9, 10)
- Per Lindvall – drums (1, 2, 3, 7–11, 13, 14, 15)
- Attila Cederbygd – programmed beats (12)
- Joakim Milder – string arrangements (1, 5, 7, 8, 11, 15)
- Stockholm Session Strings – strings (1, 7, 8, 11, 15)
- Vertavo Quartet – strings (5)
- Anneli Drecker – female vocals (1, 11)

Technical

- Ulf Holand – engineer (1, 2, 3, 8, 11, 13, 15), Pro Tools operator (1, 2, 3, 8, 11, 13, 15)
- Bob Kraushaar – engineer (3), mixing (8)
- Mike Hartung – engineer (4–7, 9, 10, 15), Pro Tools operator (4–7, 9, 10, 15)
- Janne Hansson – string recording (1, 5, 7, 8, 11, 15)
- Michael Brauer – mixing (1–7, 9, 10, 13, 15)
- Carl-Michael Herlöfsson – mixing (12)
- Clive Langer – mixing (14)
- Alan Winstanley – mixing (14)
- Stephen Hague – Logic operator (1, 2, 3, 11), mixing (8, 11)
- Martin Landquist – Logic operator (1, 2, 11, 12, 13)
- Kjetil Bjerkestrand – Pro Tools operator (13, 15)
- George Marino – mastering at Sterling Sound (New York City, New York, USA) (1, 4–7, 9, 10, 11, 13, 14, 15)
- René Schardt – mastering at Galaxy Studios (Mol, Belgium) (2, 3, 8, 12)

Production and visual

- Yiva Neumann – production coordinator, personal manager
- Jan Walaker – design, photography
- Thomas Knutstad – additional design
- Olaf Heine – band photography
- Andy Frank – cover photography
- Sverre Flatby – managing director
- Brian Lane – management (London)

== Charts ==
=== Weekly charts ===
Weekly chart performance for Lifelines
Chart (2002)	Peak position
Austrian Albums (Ö3 Austria)	2
Czech Albums (ČNS IFPI)	20
Danish Albums (Hitlisten)	9
Dutch Albums (Album Top 100)	92
European Albums (Music & Media)	4
French Albums (SNEP)	30
German Albums (Offizielle Top 100)	1
Greek International Albums (IFPI)	9
Japanese Albums (Oricon)	99
Norwegian Albums (VG-lista)	1
Polish Albums (ZPAV)	8
Scottish Albums (OCC)	81
Spanish Albums (AFYVE)	32
Swedish Albums (Sverigetopplistan)	21
Swiss Albums (Schweizer Hitparade)	6
UK Albums (OCC)	67

Weekly chart performance for Lifelines (2019 reissue)
Chart (2019)	Peak position
Belgian Albums (Ultratop Wallonia)	180
German Albums (Offizielle Top 100)	68
Hungarian Albums (MAHASZ)	17
Swiss Albums (Schweizer Hitparade)	90

=== Year-end charts ===
Year-end chart performance for Lifelines
Chart (2002)	Position
European Albums (Music & Media)	83
German Albums (Offizielle Top 100)	23
Swiss Albums (Schweizer Hitparade)	99

== Certifications ==
Certifications for Lifelines
Region	Certification	Certified units/sales
Germany (BVMI)	Gold	150,000^{^}
Norway	—	84,000
^{^} Shipments figures based on certification alone.
