= Meskanen =

Meskanen is a Finnish surname. Notable people with the surname include:

- Anne Meskanen, Finnish diplomat
- Anne Meskanen-Barman (born 1966) Finnish sculptor
- Pihla Meskanen (born 1970), Finnish architect
- Ville Meskanen (born 1995), Finnish ice hockey player
