= Risto Jarva Award =

- Location: Tampere Film Festival
- Country: Finland
- Presented by: Finnish Film Foundation
- Reward: monetary reward of 10,000 euros
- First award: 1979
- Website: Official website

The Risto Jarva Award (Finnish: Risto Jarva -palkinto) is an annual film industry award for new Finnish short films named after the Finnish filmmaker Risto Jarva. The winner is chosen by a jury of no more than three members that changes every year. Jury members are selected by the Finnish Film Foundation, which has funded and presented the award at the Tampere Film Festival since 1979.

== Winners ==
Year	Movie	Filmmaker
1979	Opeta mua rakastamaan	Anssi Blomstedt
1980	Repe - sirpaleita Reino Helismaan elämästä	Peter von Bagh
1981	The Liar	Mika Kaurismäki
1982	Vierailu	Tapani Lundgren
1983	Kotirauha	Noora Männistö
1984	Sadetanssi	Kari Paljakka
1985	19084	Heikki Paakkanen
1985	Bagatelleja opus 2. Doris; Variations 1-3; Klaus	Riitta Nelimarkka, Jaakko Seeck
1986	Häng dej pojkfan!/Nauru kaulaan nulikka!	Claes Olsson
1986	Laulu	Arto af Hällström, Janne Kuusi
1987	Hurjan pojan koti	KJ. Koski
1988	Lauran huone	Kaisa Rastimo
1989	Sijainen	Antti Peippo
1990	Raseri/Raivo	Peter Lindholm
1991	Kuusi tapaa lähestyä naista	Jaakko Virtanen
1992	Let's Dance	Paul-Anders Simma
1993	Onnen maa	Markku Pölönen
1994	Rosa Was Here	Kaija Juurikkala
1995	Kaupunkisinfonia	Heikki Ahola
1996	Taivas ja maa	Tuija Halttunen
1997	Qulleq (Traanilamppu)	Sakari Kirjavainen
1998	Eino ja mä	Pekka Uotila
1999	Liemessä	Kaisa Penttilä
1999	Sukkien euroelämää	John Webster
2000	Apinajuttu	Esa Illi
2001	Hyppääjä	PV Lehtinen
2002	Turon baari	Janne Kuusi
2003	Tähteläiset	Veli Granö
2004	Isältä pojalle	Visa Koiso-Kanttila
2005	Hiljainen tila	Mervi Junkkonen
2006	365 päivää - Reijo Kelan videopäiväkirja 1999	Reijo Kela
2007	Luonto ja terveys	Panu Heikkilä
2008	Palnan tyttäret	Kiti Luostarinen
2009	Hanasaari A	Hannes Vartiainen, Pekka Veikkolainen
2010	Steam of Life	Joonas Berghäll, Mika Hotakainen
2011	Sweet Mov(i)e	Jan Ijäs
2012	Korsoteoria	Antti Heikki Pesonen
2013	Finnish Blood Swedish Heart	Mika Ronkainen
2013	6954 kilometriä kotiin	Juan Reina
2014	Paratiisin avaimet	Hamy Ramezan
2015	Onni	Sanna Liljander
2016	Viikset	Anni Oja
2017	Hobbyhorse Revolution	Selma Vilhunen
2018	Eatnanvuloš lottit	Marja Helander
2019	Eläinsilta U-3033	Milja Viita
2020	To Teach a Bird to Fly	Minna Rainio & Mark Roberts
