= Forever Not Yours =

Single by A-ha

from the album Lifelines
- Released: 2 April 2002
- Studio: Lydlab (Oslo); Strongroom (London)
- Genre: Synth-pop
- Length: 4:08 (single version)
- Label: WEA
- Songwriters: Morten Harket; Magne Furuholmen; Ole Sverre Olsen
- Producers: Stephen Hague; Martin Landquist

A-ha singles chronology
"I Wish I Cared" (2001)	"Forever Not Yours" (2002)	"Lifelines" (2002)

Music video
- "Forever Not Yours" on YouTube

"Forever Not Yours" is a song by Norwegian synth-pop band A-ha, released as the lead single from their seventh studio album, Lifelines. It was sent to radio stations in parts of Europe on 22 February 2002 (15 April in Belgium) and was released commercially on 2 April.

The cover of the commercial release features a closeup shot of the black front end of a 1950s Cadillac standing on flatland.

== Background ==
Band vocalist Morten Harket described the song as "one of those songs that sums us up. Melancholy, and at the same time uplifting – soaring."

The phrase "forever not yours" is a play on the love letter sign off "forever yours".

== Music video ==
The song's music video, filmed on location in Cuba, was directed by Harald Zwart. The theme of the video is based on the Biblical floods and Noah's Ark. There are many famous faces entering the 'VIP entrance' in this video, including look-a-likes for Desmond Tutu, Madonna, Lenny Kravitz, and Elizabeth II.

== MTV Unplugged appearance ==
In 2017, A-ha appeared on the television series MTV Unplugged and played and recorded acoustic versions of many of their popular songs for the album MTV Unplugged – Summer Solstice in Giske, Norway, including "Forever Not Yours".

== Track listing ==
- CD: WEA / 0927 44859-2 Europe
1. "Forever Not Yours" – 4:08
2. "Differences" (original demo) – 2:49
3. "Hunting High and Low" (live in Oslo) – 7:07
4. "Manhattan Skyline" (live in Oslo) – 6:14

== Charts ==
Chart performance for "Forever Not Yours"
Chart (2002)	Peak position
Austria (Ö3 Austria Top 40)	31
Czech Republic (IFPI)	2
Germany (GfK)	18
Hungary (Rádiós Top 40)	15
Italy (FIMI)	24
Netherlands (Single Top 100)	82
Norway (VG-lista)	1
Poland Airplay (Music & Media)	1
Sweden (Sverigetopplistan)	46
Switzerland (Schweizer Hitparade)	26
UK Singles (OCC)	175

== Personnel ==
- Words by Morten Harket and Ole Sverre Olsen
- Music by Magne Furuholmen and Morten Harket
- Produced by Stephen Hague and Martin Landquist
- Additional arrangement by Keller, Schroeder
- Recorded at Lydlab Studios, Oslo and Strongroom, London
