= Marja Helander =

Finnish-Sámi photographer (born 1965)

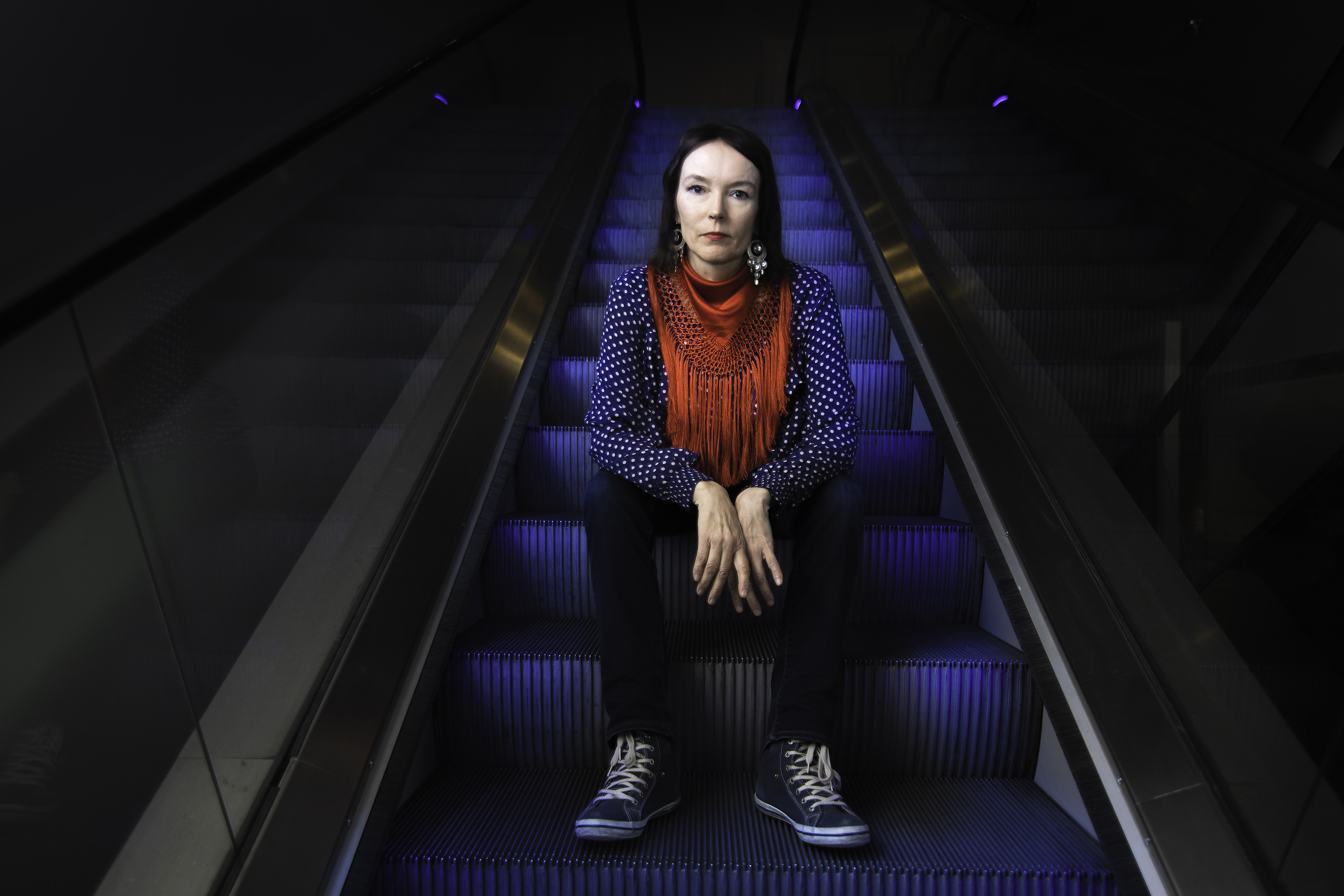
- Sámi photographer, video artist, visual artist and film-maker Marja Helander in October 2018
- Born: August 29, 1965 (age 60); Helsinki
- Education: University of Helsinki
- Website: http://www.marjahelander.com/

Marja Helander (born 29 August 1965) is a Finnish urban Sámi photographer, artist and filmmaker.

== Early life ==
Marja Helander was born in Helsinki, Finland, where she still works and lives. Helander's mother is Finnish and her father is a Sámi from Utsjoki. Even though Helander grew up in Helsinki, she spent her vacations with her father's family in Utsjoki.

== Education ==
From 1985-1986, Helander studied at the University of Helsinki. In 1986, she started studying painting at the Liminka Art College. In 1988, she graduated from the Liminka Art School and started studying visual arts at the Lahti Institute of Fine Arts, from which she graduated in 1992. After that she started to study photography at the University of Art and Design in Helsinki, Finland, graduating in 1999. Since Helander learned Finnish and not Sámi at home, she moved at some point to Inari to study the Sámi language and culture at the Sámi Education Institute (Northern Sami: Sámi oahpahusguovddáš).

== Awards ==
- 1994 – Fotofinlandia finalist
- 2018 - ImagineNATVE Film + Media Festival, Best Experimental Storytelling for Birds in the Earth
- 2018 – Risto Jarva Award for Birds in the Earth
