= NAID =

NAID is an acronym which may refer to:

- In medicine, Non-Anemic Iron Deficiency
- National Association for Information Destruction
- NAID, an Association of Defence Communities (NAID/ADC)
- NAID (article identifier), a journal article identification number in Japan
- North American International Demoparty, a Canadian Demoscene event held in 1995 and 1996.
- United States National Archives and Records Administration item identification number

== See also ==
- Nåid
- Noaydde
