= Ending on a High Note =

Ending on a High Note may refer to:

- Ending on a High Note Tour, a worldwide concert tour by a-ha
- Ending on a High Note, an episode of the TV series Fame
