= Lifelines (song) =

Single by A-ha

from the album Lifelines
- Released: 8 July 2002
- Genre: Pop rock
- Length: 3:57 (single version); 4:17 (album version)
- Label: WEA
- Songwriter: Magne Furuholmen
- Producers: Martin Landquist; Stephen Hague

A-ha singles chronology
"Forever Not Yours" (2002)	"Lifelines" (2002)	"Did Anyone Approach You?" (2002)

Music video
- "Lifelines" on YouTube

"Lifelines" is a song by Norwegian band A-ha, released as the second single and the title track from their 2002 album of the same name.

== Music video ==
This video is based on the Norwegian short film A Year Along the Abandoned Road, directed by Morten Skallerud in 1991. Time-lapse photography was used to make the video, at 50,000 times the normal speed; the original film was 12 minutes long and was filmed over 105 days, and edited to fit the song length and the scenes with the band members.

The subject of the short film was Børfjord, a semi-deserted fisherman's village in northern Norway, Hasvik Municipality.

The opening sequence features a poem written by King Olav V of Norway:

When I look back

I see the landscapes
That I have walked through
But it is different

All the great trees are gone
It seems there are
Remnants of them

But it is the afterglow
Inside of you

Of all those you met

Who meant something in your life

— Olav Rex, August 1977

== MTV Unplugged appearance ==
In 2017, A-ha appeared on the television series MTV Unplugged and played and recorded acoustic versions of many of their popular songs for the album MTV Unplugged – Summer Solstice in Giske, Norway, including "Lifelines".

== Track listings ==
Europe: CD maxi, WEA / 0927 47037-2
No.	Title	Length
1.	"Lifelines" (album version edit)	4:01
2.	"Lifelines" (Boogieman remix)	4:55
3.	"Lifelines" (Console remix)	4:30
4.	"Lifelines" (Palace of Pleasure remix)	4:45
5.	"Lifelines" (Millenia Nova remix)	5:41

Europe: CD maxi, WEA / 0927 47038-2
No.	Title	Length
1.	"Lifelines" (album version edit)	4:01
2.	"Solace" (Tore Johansson version)	5:08
3.	"Dragonfly" (Magne Furuholmen solo version)	3:39
4.	"Turn the Light Down" (Langer & Winstanley version)	4:48
5.	"Lifelines" (demo)	5:18
6.	"You Wanted More" (Stephen Hague version)	3:40

Europe: enhanced CD, WEA / 0927 48483-2
No.	Title	Length
1.	"Lifelines" (radio edit)	3:57
2.	"Hunting High and Low" (recorded live at Vallhall, Oslo, 24 March 2001)	7:07
3.	"Manhattan Skyline" (recorded live at Vallhall, Oslo, 24 March 2001)	6:13
4.	"Lifelines" (music video on enhanced section)

Europe: promo, WEA / PR 03215
No.	Title	Length
1.	"Lifelines" (radio edit)	3:59

Germany: promo, WEA / PR 03382
No.	Title	Length
1.	"Lifelines" (Apoptygma Berzerk remix)	6:22

Russia: CD Maxi, WEA, WWW / 5050466225429, НН-138CD/02
No.	Title	Length
1.	"Lifelines" (Palace of Pleasure rmx)	4:46
2.	"Summer Moved On" (remix)	6:02
3.	"Minor Earth Major Sky" (Ian Pooley's Deep mix)	6:14
4.	"Solace" (Tore Johansson version)	5:09
5.	"Velvet" (Millenia Nova mix)	3:58
6.	"Lifelines" (Millenia Nova rmx)	5:41
7.	"Dragonfly" (Magne Furuholmen solo version)	3:36

== Charts ==
Chart performance for "Lifelines"
Chart (2002)	Peak position
Germany (GfK)	32
Hungary (Single Top 40)	19
Norway (VG-lista)	18
Poland Airplay (Music & Media)	1
UK Singles (Official Charts)	78
