= Antje Westermann =

German actress (born 1971)

- Born: 13 September 1971 (age 54); Dresden, East Germany
- Occupation: Actress
- Years active: 1987-present

Antje Westermann (born 13 September 1971) is a German actress. She appeared in more than thirty films since 1987.

== Selected filmography ==
Year	Title	Role	Notes
1994	Angst	Tanja Seitz	TV film
1995	Zwei zum Verlieben	Katja	TV series, 1 episode
1995	Satan's Children	Heike	TV film
1997	Lea Katz – Die Kriminalpsychologin	Anke Straub	TV series, 1 episode
1997	Death Game	Angelika Speitel	TV film
1997	Gesches Gift	Beta	
1998	Trouville Beach	Alice	
2000	Gran Paradiso	Rosi	
2003	Wolfsburg	Katja	
2003	Mein Name ist Bach	Johanna Bach	
