= Pihla Meskanen =

Finnish architect (born 1970)

Pihla Meskanen (born 1970) is a Finnish architect and educator who specialises in architecture education for children and young people. She co-founded the Arkki School of Architecture for Children and Youth in 1993 and served as its principal until 2019. She later founded Arkki International, which develops educational programmes based on the Arkki model internationally.

Meskanen has received the Pietilä Prize (2004), the Finnish State Prize for Children's Culture (2005) and the Asko Avonius Award (2018). In 2018, she was also appointed Knight First Class of the Order of the Lion of Finland.

== Education and career ==
Meskanen studied architecture at the Helsinki University of Technology, now part of Aalto University, and completed a master's degree in architecture in 2001. In the same year, she completed specialist pedagogical studies for teachers in basic education in the arts at the Lahti Institute of Design. While studying architecture, Meskanen co-founded the Arkki School of Architecture for Children and Youth with Miina Vuorinen and Tuuli Tiitola-Meskanen in 1993. The school's early activities included architecture courses and hut-building camps for children, and its programme later expanded to long-term architecture education. Alongside her work in architecture education, Meskanen has practised as an architect with Olli Pursiainen. Their work has included residential, school and daycare projects.

== Pedagogy ==
Meskanen's work has focused on architecture and the built environment as subjects of education for children and young people. At Arkki, architecture education developed as long-term basic education in the arts alongside shorter courses, camps and workshops.

The Arkki model has been discussed in research on architecture and built-environment education, including comparative studies of children's architecture education and empirical research on children's design processes and learning environments.

Meskanen has written and co-written publications on architecture education. Her children's book Pieni majakirja (2006), about huts and building, was among the works analysed in a 2015 Aalto University study of architecture education in Finnish children's literature. Her article "Discovering the ART in ARCHITECTURE" appeared in the International Society for Education through Art publication IMAG in 2016.

In 2026, Meskanen was appointed to the architecture working group of the Finnish National Agency for Education's TOPS2028 reform. The working group is preparing the architecture-specific section of the national core curriculum for basic education in the arts.

== Design ==
Meskanen has worked on projects involving children and young people in the planning of schools, neighbourhoods and other built environments. Helsingin Sanomat has reported on projects in which children examined school environments and contributed ideas to planning processes, including the development of the Hernesaari area in Helsinki.

Participatory planning has also formed part of Arkki's educational activities. International research has discussed the use of collaborative projects and urban-planning workshops within the school's architecture education. Meskanen was also a co-author of a 2012 peer-reviewed study in Digital Creativity on the C my city! project, in which children and young people used digital storytelling to describe their home city.

== International work ==
Meskanen's work in architecture education has been covered by international media. The Sunday Morning Post discussed Arkki and architecture education for children in Finland in 2012, and The Straits Times covered the school's approach to design education in 2017.

Meskanen founded Arkki International in 2013 to develop the educational model internationally. By 2020, Arkki was operating in seven countries, and Meskanen was working primarily with its international activities. Helsingin Sanomat reported in 2020 on architecture and urban-planning education organised through Arkki in Thailand and Vietnam.

In Vietnam, the participatory urban-planning project Children Innovate, organised by Arkki with UNICEF Vietnam, Saigon Innovation Hub and the Ho Chi Minh City Department of Planning and Architecture, received a UNICEF Child Friendly Cities Initiative Inspire Award in 2019 in the category Meaningful Child Participation.

== Awards and honours ==
- 2004 – Pietilä Prize, Building Information Foundation RTS.
- 2005 – Finnish State Prize for Children's Culture.
- 2013 – Visual Arts Educator of the Year, Finnish Association of Art Schools for Children and Young People.
- 2018 – Asko Avonius Award.
- 2018 – Knight First Class of the Order of the Lion of Finland.

== Selected publications ==
- Meskanen, Pihla (2006). Pieni majakirja. Helsinki: Tammi. ISBN 978-951-31-3559-1.
- Meskanen, Pihla; Hummelin, Niina, eds. (2010). Creating the Future: Ideas on Architecture and Design Education = Ajatuksia arkkitehtuuri- ja muotoilukasvatuksesta. Arkki School of Architecture for Children and Youth. ISBN 978-952-92-6986-0.
- Ohashi, Yutaro; Ohashi, Kana; Meskanen, Pihla; Hummelin, Niina; Kato, Fumitoshi; Kynäslahti, Heikki (2012). "What children and youth told about their home city in digital stories in 'C my city!'". Digital Creativity. 23 (2): 126–135. doi:10.1080/14626268.2012.709942.
- Meskanen, Pihla (2016). "Discovering the ART in ARCHITECTURE". IMAG (3): 92–105. doi:10.24981/2414-3332-3.1.2016.21.
- Meskanen, Pihla (2017). Iloista rakentelua: spagettitorni & leijuva linna. Helsinki: Nemo. ISBN 978-951-1-31483-7.
- Meskanen, Pihla; Hummelin, Niina; Karvinen, Kaisa; Parikka, Sini (2019). Arkki: 25 Years of Creative Education via Architecture from Finland. Arkki International. ISBN 978-952-94-2531-0.
