= Did Anyone Approach You? =

Single by A-ha

from the album Lifelines
- Released: 30 September 2002
- Recorded: 2002
- Genre: Alternative rock; pop rock
- Length: 4:10
- Label: WEA
- Songwriter: Paul Waaktaar-Savoy
- Producer: Tore Johansson

A-ha singles chronology
"Lifelines" (2002)	"Did Anyone Approach You?" (2002)	"The Sun Always Shines on T.V. Live" (2003)

"Did Anyone Approach You?" is a song by the Norwegian synth-pop band A-ha. It was the third single to be taken from their 2002 album Lifelines. It was recorded at The Alabaster Room in New York City sometime between June 2001 and January 2002.

== Track listing ==
1. "Did Anyone Approach You? (Original Album Version)" (4:11)
2. "Did Anyone Approach You? (Turner Remix)" (3:43)
3. "Did Anyone Approach You? (Reamped)" (4:51)
4. "Did Anyone Approach You? (Tore Johansson Remix)" (5:55)
5. "Afternoon High (Demo Version)" (4:40)
6. "Did Anyone Approach You? (Video Clip)" (4:11)

== Video ==
The video was filmed by Lauren Savoy, the wife of A-ha guitarist Paul Waaktaar-Savoy. It was shot at Ullevaal Stadion on 6 June 2002, the first concert on the band's Lifelines tour.

== Charts ==
Chart performance for "Did Anyone Approach You?"
Chart (2002)	Peak position
Germany (GfK)	67
