= Gran Paradiso (film) =

- Theatrical release poster
- Directed by: Miguel Alexandre
- Screenplay by: Georg Heinzen
- Produced by: Henrik Meyer
- Starring: Ken Duken; Regula Grauwiller; Gregor Törzs
- Cinematography: Peter Indergand
- Edited by: Inge Behrens
- Music by: Dominic Roth
- Production companies: Letterbox Filmproduktion; Monty Filmgesellschaft
- Distributed by: Warner Bros.
- Release date: 9 November 2000
- Running time: 102 minutes
- Country: Germany
- Language: German

Gran Paradiso is a 2000 German adventure film directed by Miguel Alexandre.

== Cast ==
- Ken Duken - Mark
- Regula Grauwiller - Lisa
- Gregor Törzs - Wolf
- Max Herbrechter - Martin
- Frank Giering - Edwin
- Erhan Emre - Rocky
- Alexander Hörbe - Harpo
- Antje Westermann - Rosi
- Gerhard Garbers - Gatterburg
- Monika Häckermann - Pflegerin
