= Mein Name ist Bach =

2003 film

- Directed by: Dominique de Rivaz
- Screenplay by: Jean-Luc Bourgeois; Leo Raat; Dominique de Rivaz
- Produced by: Karl Baumgartner; Uta Ganschow; Thanassis Karathanos; Jean-Louis Porchet; Gérard Ruey
- Starring: Jürgen Vogel; Vadim Glowna
- Cinematography: Ciro Cappellari
- Edited by: Isabel Meier
- Music by: Frédéric Devreese
- Release dates: August 2003 (Locarno); 8 April 2004
- Running time: 97 minutes
- Countries: Switzerland; Germany
- Language: German

Mein Name ist Bach (English: Jagged Harmonies: Bach vs. Frederick II) is a 2003 Swiss film directed by Dominique de Rivaz. The premiere took place within the framework of the 56th Locarno Film Festival, which was held from August 6 to August 16, 2003. It was Switzerland's submission to the 77th Academy Awards for the Academy Award for Best Foreign Language Film, but was not accepted as a nominee.

== Plot ==
On the occasion of the birth of his grandchild Adam, Johann Sebastian Bach, whose eyesight is waning, visits his son Carl Philipp Emanuel Bach, who is employed at the court of the Prussian King Friedrich II.

The belligerent king wants to put the composer to the test and gives him a theme for improvisation, that he has previously had refined by his flute teacher Johann Joachim Quantz, who also teaches Friedrich's sister Amalie. Bach, however, exhausted by the journey, asks to be given some time. At court he meets his old friend Quantz again. Bach immediately returns to Leipzig, where he feels more comfortable, but is still fascinated by the theme proposed by the king.

While Amalie takes a liking to the novelty of the music of Bach's son Wilhelm Friedemann Bach, King Friedrich is reminded of the humiliation by his father Friedrich Wilhelm I. For example, Friedrich's father executed his childhood friend, Lieutenant Hans Hermann von Katte, after his adolescent son tried to escape with him. The non-conformist Wilhelm Friedemann, on the other hand, whom Bach considers the most talented of his sons, lives in conflict with the cautious down-to-earth attitude of his brother, who in turn suffers from his father's preference for Wilhelm Friedemann.

Bach organises a concert in honour of the king and proposes that they both play a composition based on the king's theme in a duet. Friedrich loses the rhythm and reacts angrily, accusing Quantz of being in league with Bach. Bach, however, does not let the theme of the king rest, and so he composes a six-part canon based on this theme, the Musikalisches Opfer.

Friedrich learns that Amalie has had an affair with Wilhelm Friedemann, but she defends herself against the reprimands of her brother. Amalie wants to continue the relationship, but Wilhelm Friedemann refuses to take her to Halle because he cannot offer her a life there that is appropriate for a princess.

Friedrich, who is about to move to his new palace Sanssouci in Potsdam, asks Bach to become his court composer. Bach refuses. Nevertheless, a more personal conversation takes place between the two of them, in which Friedrich tells the musician about the humiliation of his father in his childhood, while Bach accuses himself of having failed in bringing up his quarreling sons.

When Voltaire arrives to Sanssouci at the wish of Frederick II, Bach gets into the carriage at the customs station in his place.

== Cast ==
- Vadim Glowna: Johann Sebastian Bach
- Jürgen Vogel: Friedrich II
- Karoline Herfurth: Princess Amalie
- Anatole Taubman: Wilhelm Friedemann Bach
- Paul Herwig: Carl Philipp Emanuel Bach
- Philippe Vuilleumier: Johann Joachim Quantz
- Michel Cassagne: Voltaire
- Gilles Tschudi: Secretary Goltz
- Antje Westermann: Johanna Bach
- Detlev Buck: Customs officer
- Henning Peker: Royal messenger
- Hans-Michael Rehberg: Doctor
- Joachim Tomaschewsky: Court doctor
- Patrice-Luc Doumeyrou: Maupertuis
- Bernard Liègme: Lackey Stumm
- Daniel Lommatzsch: City messenger

== See also ==
- Cinema of Switzerland
- List of submissions to the 77th Academy Awards for Best Foreign Language Film
- List of Swiss submissions for the Academy Award for Best Foreign Language Film
