= Ken Duken =

German actor

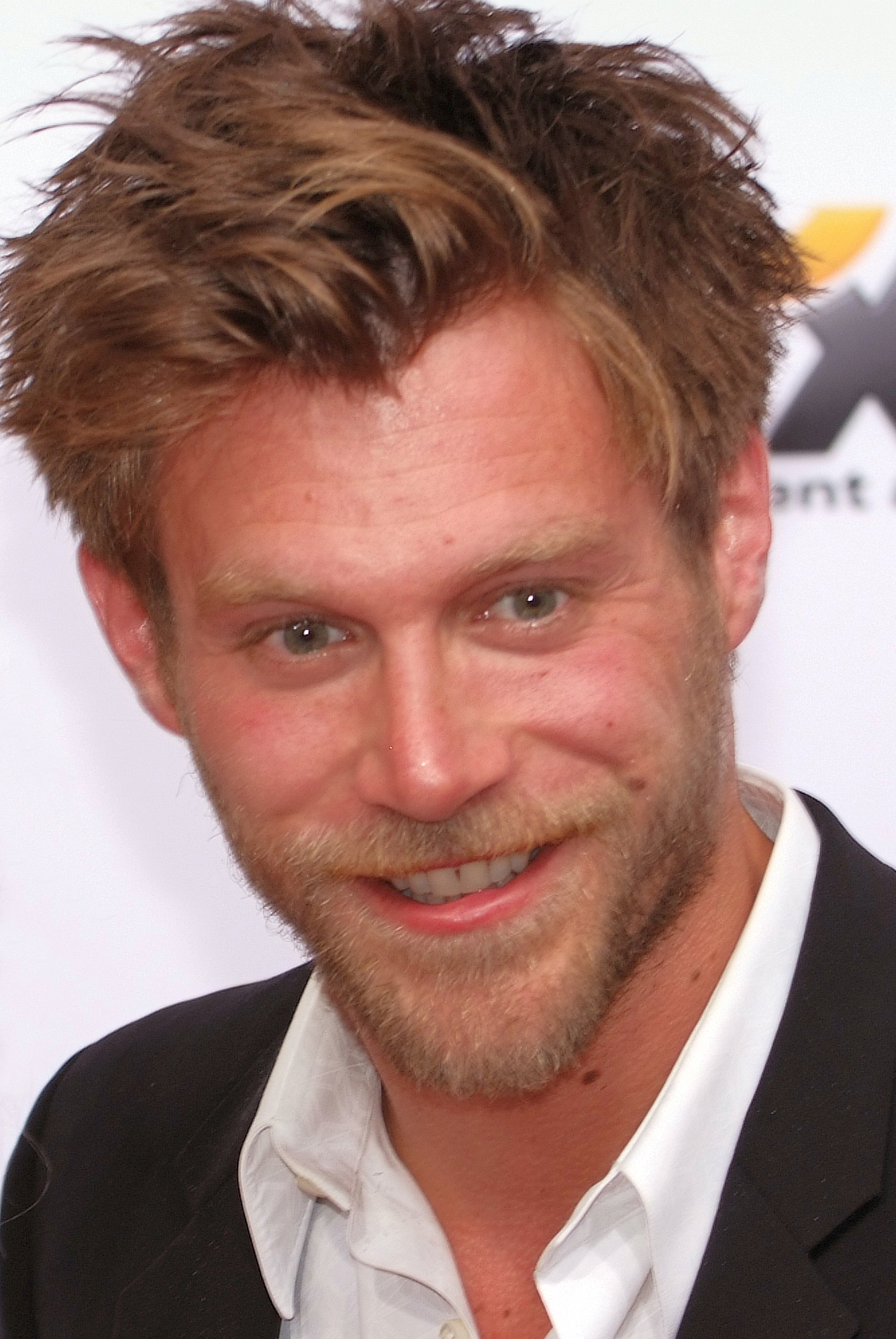
- Occupation(s): Actor, director
- Years active: 1999–present
- Spouse: Marisa Leonie Bach (m. 2000)
- Children: 1

Ken Duken is a German actor and director.

== Early life ==
Ken Duken is the third child of film and stage actress Christina Loeb; his father is a doctor. Duken never attended a drama school but took courses in drama, including under James Reynold. The actor initially played various theatre roles, including in such plays as Der Besuch der alten Dame (The visit of the old lady), Das Haus in Montevideo (The house in Montevideo) and in various Shakespeare plays. He debuted as a film actor in 1997, playing a small role in the television crime film Blutiger Ernst alongside Nadja Uhl and Daniel Brühl.

== Career ==
Duken played his first major role on a movie screen in 1999, alongside Franka Potente and Heiner Lauterbach in Friedemann Fromm's Paradise Mall (Schlaraffenland). That same year he starred in Miguel Alexandre's drama Gran Paradiso, which was nominated for the German Film Award. For this film, in which he plays Mark, a young wheelchair user, he completed three months wheelchair-training. In 2003 he played a major role in Deadly Diversion by Curt Faudon. In 2005 his career continued in the cinema, with Buket Alakus's award-winning tragicomedy Offside.

Duken was a member of the cast in the core produced by ZDF since 2002 police drama series Night Shift by Lars Becker as a young Commissioner Teddy Schrader.

Also known is his portrayal of a Communist spy in the movie Karol: A Man Who Became Pope.

In the autumn of 2006 he was in Tolstoy's War and Peace by Robert Dornhelm in Russia and Lithuania, in which he played the role of Anatol Kuragin. The SWR teleplay Welcome Home, Ken embodied in the war returnees Ben Winter, was shot mid-December 2007.

In 2003, together with Duken including Bernd Katzmarczyk and Norbert Kneissl worked with the production company Grand Hôtel Pictures. In its first work From another point of view he plays next to his wife Marisa Leonie Bach and Dominique Pinon. In 2009, he continued his own production number with the psycho-thriller Distance.

In addition to his work as an actor, Duken is now increasingly found behind the camera. For his film From another point of view, as well as several music videos, such as for Oomph! Rapper and the Curse, he has directed.

In 2008 Duken played the role of SS Captain and head of the Oslo Gestapo Siegfried Fehmer, in Max Manus, a film about the Norwegian resistance. The role of the smart ladies' man Fehmer, who could quickly change to a brutal torturer, was good preparation for his performance in Quentin Tarantino's Inglourious Basterds (2009). Duken can be seen in chapter four of Inglourious Basterds as one of the cardplaying German soldiers. The card on his forehead reads Mata Hari.

In 2009 Duken played the character Ralf in Til Schweiger's film Zweiohrküken. In 2011 he starred in a BBC television drama called The Sinking of the Laconia (2011), in which he played Werner Hartenstein, commander of a German U-boat, and in the German TV movie Carl & Bertha about the life of Carl and Bertha Benz. He also starred in the 2011 British film Chalet Girl.

In 2015, he directed the movie Berlin Falling. which eerily predicted a Berlin terror attack that happened in December 2016.

In 2021, he starred in Algiers Confidential, as a Prince Harry lookalike.

== Personal life ==
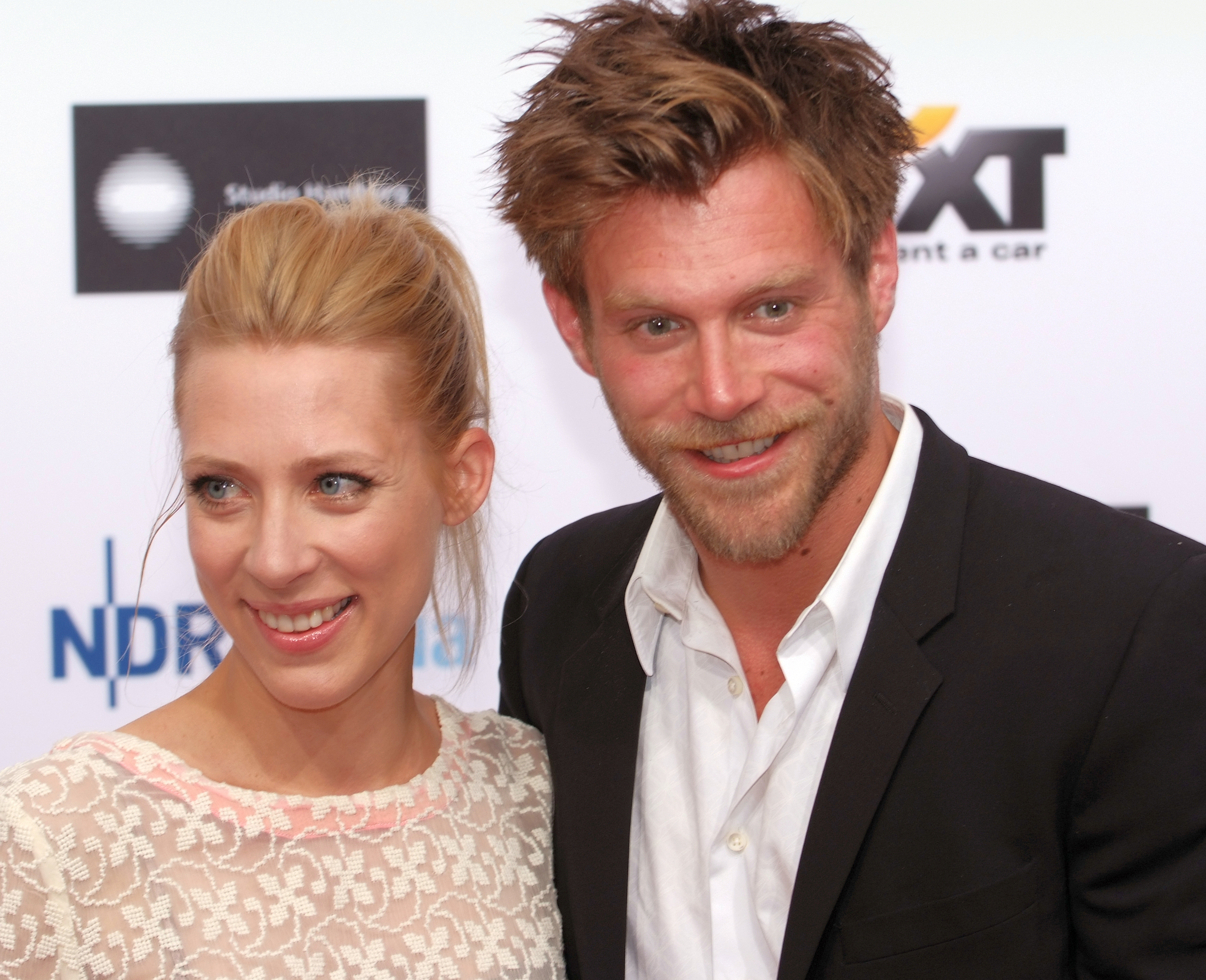
Duken and Marisa Leonie Bach in 2012

Since October 2000 Duken has been married to German actress Marisa Leonie Bach, a descendant of composer Johann Sebastian Bach. The couple has a son, Viggo (born October 2009).

== Partial filmography ==
- Paradise Mall (1999) - Laser
- Gran Paradiso (2000) - Mark
- Tricked (2000, TV film) - Steve
- Der Kanacke (2000) - Der Deutsche
- 100 Pro (2001) - Floh
- Run While You Can (2001, TV film) - Rudi Novak
- Kiss and Run (2002) - Max
- Nitschewo (2003) - Jim
- Nachtschicht (2003–2008, TV series, 5 episodes) - Teddy Schrader
- Deadly Diversion (2004) - Adrian
- Offside (2005) - Toni - Trainer
- A Pirate's Heart (2006, Germany, TV Movie) - Klaus Störtebeker
- Ali Baba et les 40 voleurs (2007, France, TV film) - Séraphin
- War and Peace (2007, franco-italo-allemande, TV miniseries) - Anatole Kuragin
- A Long Way Home (2008, TV film) - Ben Winter
- Resolution 819 (2008, France, TV film) - Thom Karremans
- 1½ Knights: In Search of the Ravishing Princess Herzelinde (2008) - Wärter
- Max Manus (2008, Norway) - Kriminalrat Siegfried Fehmer
- Distance (2009) - Daniel Bauer
- Inglourious Basterds (2009) - German Soldier / Mata Hari
- Flight into the night – the accident at Überlingen (2009, Germany, TV film) - Johann Lenders
- World on fire (2009, USA) - Ian
- Rabbit Without Ears 2 (2009, Germany) - Ralf
- Kajínek (2010) - Bukovsky
- Pius XII: Under the Roman Sky (2010) - Danneker
- The Sinking of the Laconia (2011, Germany, TV miniseries) - Werner Hartenstein
- Chalet Girl (2011, United Kingdom) - Mikki Nieminen
- My Last Day Without You (2011, USA) - Niklas Henke
- Carl & Bertha (2011) - Carl Benz
- A Day for a Miracle (2011, Germany, Austria, TV film) - Markus Höchstmann
- Schief gewickelt (2011, Germany, TV film) - Eddy Brennfleck
- On the Inside (2011) - Marco Held
- One Last Game (2011) - Gellert
- Die Männer der Emden (2012, Germany) - Karl Overbeck
- Two Lives (2012) - Sven Solbach
- Hotel Adlon: A Family Saga (2013, Germany, TV miniseries) - Julian Zimmermann
- Robin Hood (2013) - Alexander Scholl
- Banklady (2013) - Kommissar Fischer
- False Freedom (2013) - Dr. Viktor Voss
- Northmen: A Viking Saga (2014) - Thorald
- Romeo and Juliet (2014, TV series) - Mercutio
- Coming In (2014) - Robert
- Frau Müller muss weg! (2015, Germany) - Patrick Jeskow
- Arletty, une passion coupable (2015, France, TV film) - Hans Jürgen Soehring
- Treppe Aufwärts (2015) - Beyer
- Adidas vs. Puma: The Brother's Feud (2016, Germany, TV film) - Adi Dassler
- Conni & Co. (2016) - Jürgen Klawitter
- The Lion Woman (2016) - Andrej
- Conni & Co. 2 – Das Geheimnis des T-Rex (2017) - Jürgen Klawitter
- Berlin Falling (2017, Germany) - Frank
- Parfum (2018, Germany, TV series) - Roman Seliger
- A Rose in Winter (2018) - Hans Lipps
- Counterpart (2018–2019, TV series) - Spencer
- Traumfabrik (2019) - Alex Hellberg
- Vic the Viking and the Magic Sword (2019) - Leif (German version, voice)
- Professionals - Kurt Neumann
- Fate: The Winx Saga (2021) - Andreas
