= Berlin Falling =

2017 film

- Directed by: Ken Duken
- Starring: Tom Wlaschiha; Ken Duken
- Release date: 13 July 2017
- Running time: 1h 31min
- Country: Germany
- Language: German

Berlin Falling is a 2017 German thriller film directed by Ken Duken. It tells the story of a retired soldier who picks up a mysterious hitchhiker.

== Plot ==
A terrorist plans a brutal attack in the middle of Christmas celebrations in Berlin. He hijacks a car outside Berlin, forcing the driver to take him to the center of the city so he can carry out the attack.

Frank is given an ultimatum by his soon-to-be ex-wife: he has one last chance for a good meeting with his daughter Lily, or she'll file for sole custody. Frank nervously leaves for Berlin to see them. On his way he meets a man in need of a ride, so he begrudgingly offers to accompany him. During the drive, the man, who calls himself Andreas, starts chattering away, which bothers Frank. Frank makes a hard turn on the road to scare him into silence, which causes Andreas' bag to open and reveal what seems to be a bomb. Frank tries to beat information about the bomb out of Andreas, but the latter pulls out a gun and forces him back into the car. After stopping briefly at a drive-thru, Andreas forces Frank to eat as he doesn't want him to faint while rambling about fast food and the USA.

Frank sees a police car and gets their attention by speeding, but Andreas shows him live footage of a man with a gun on a train with Frank's daughter ad wife, threatening that if Frank doesn't comply he won't check in with his associate and they'll be killed. Frank tries to make the officers leave quickly, but when one of them insists on checking the car, Frank knocks him out and shoots his partner in the vest. Andreas reminds him that either the police officers are killed or his wife and daughter will be. Frank hesitates, so Andreas gets out of the car and brutally murders one officer. When about to kill the other, Frank shoots him out of mercy to spare him from the suffering his partner went through. The two men then take the bodies off the road. As Frank is about to break down, Andreas tells him to keep calm, calling him "soldier".

Andreas makes Frank stop at a small store and tells him to get him some painkillers along with some apple juice. When Frank comes out without the painkillers and lies saying they didn't have any, Andreas shoves him against a wall and tells him if he'd just followed orders as he was supposed to, he would have only needed to take him to Berlin and that he was to blame for the incident with the two police officers earlier. He then takes Frank to a building and they enter a room with a camera, a laptop, and a projector. Andreas orders Frank to change his clothes into a German military uniform and when he tries to resist, he shoots him with a 20k Volts taser. While he's on the floor, incapacitated, Andreas shows him his family on the projector and tells him that he's "really done it this time", then calls somebody and starts reciting a number. Frank begs for his daughter's life so Andreas tells him he has one last chance. Frank complies and wears the uniform.

Andreas makes Frank get on his knees, zip-ties his hands, and wears a mask, then he starts recording with the projector showing war videos as an audio praising Allah and condemning the infidels plays in the background. He calls Frank a special "kafir" (in this case, sworn enemies of Islam and Muslims), then identifies him with his full name, date, place of birth, and full rank (First sergeant of the German Special Aerial Reconnaissance, Company 260 in Seedorf). He makes him watch images of himself as a "family man" and then as a soldier and orders him to confess what he has done on June 19, 2011, accusing him of murdering innocent Muslim children. Initially Frank doesn't comply, so Andreas hits him. Frank admits he completed his mission, the "observation of the area of Kunduz as part of the Task Force 51". He then describes how days before the night of the 20th of April, attacks from a group called Hajis started on their camp, so that night they found their hiding place and after Frank confirmed there were no civilians, the Americans launched an air strike on the place.

Andreas forces him to look at pictures of the aftermath of that night, of burnt victims, children specifically, and calls Frank a coward. He then announces that to pay for what he did, Frank will strap the bomb on himself and detonate it in Berlin, bringing war to Europe.

Andreas forces Frank into the car and makes him drive. While in the car he reveals he actually hates Muslims, the video was just to make people believe it was an attack in the name of Islam so they would react against the Arabs and stop depending on the United States to start defending Germany. They arrive at Berlin station, where Andreas tells Frank he'll be a martyr and where he'll have to detonate the bomb. Frank gets out of the car and when he hesitates, Andreas reminds him of Lily. Frank reacts by beating him and telling him that he remembers the children who were murdered that night, the smells, and the pain. Andreas hits him in the head with a rock, but Frank prevails and beats him almost unconscious, then drags him into the car and detonates the bomb in it.

In the last scene, Frank's wife is seen walking out of the station with their daughter, with distant sirens wailing, listening to Frank's voicemail. He tells her not to believe everything people will say and in the next message, he's heard struggling to breathe after Andreas tased him, pleading for his daughter, saying he'll do anything to save her life.

== Cast ==
- Tom Wlaschiha as Andreas
- Ken Duken as Frank Balzer
- Kida Khodr Ramadan as Okan
- Marisa Leonie Bach as Claudia
