= Majestät brauchen Sonne =

1999 film directed by Peter Schamoni

- Directed by: Peter Schamoni
- Written by: Peter Schamoni
- Produced by: Peter Schamoni; Rob Houwer
- Cinematography: Michael Bartlett; Ernst Hirsch; Konrad Kotowski; Peter Rosenwanger; Thomas Rosié; Morten Skallerud
- Edited by: Thomas Krattenmacher; Carolin Rethfeld
- Production company: Peter Schamoni Filmproduktion; Verenigde Nederlandse Film & Televisiecompagnie
- Release dates: 27 October 1999 (Leipzig); 10 November 2000
- Running time: 105 minutes
- Country: Germany; Netherlands
- Language: German

Majestät brauchen Sonne (lit. 'Majesty Needs Sun') is a 1999 German-Dutch documentary film directed by Peter Schamoni. It is about the last German emperor Wilhelm II and especially his relationship with cinema and photography, which he used extensively for self-promotion. The film is also known as Majestät brauchen Sonne – Wilhelm II..

The film premiered at the International Leipzig Film Week on 27 October 1999. It was released in regular German cinemas on 9 November 2000. The German TV premiere was on ZDF on 9 May 2002.

Der Tagesspiegel called the film entertaining and educational. Schamoni and Rob Houwer received the Bavarian Film Award for Best Production.
