= Tampere Film Festival =

Short film festival in Tampere, Finland

Coordinates: 61°30′N 023°46′E

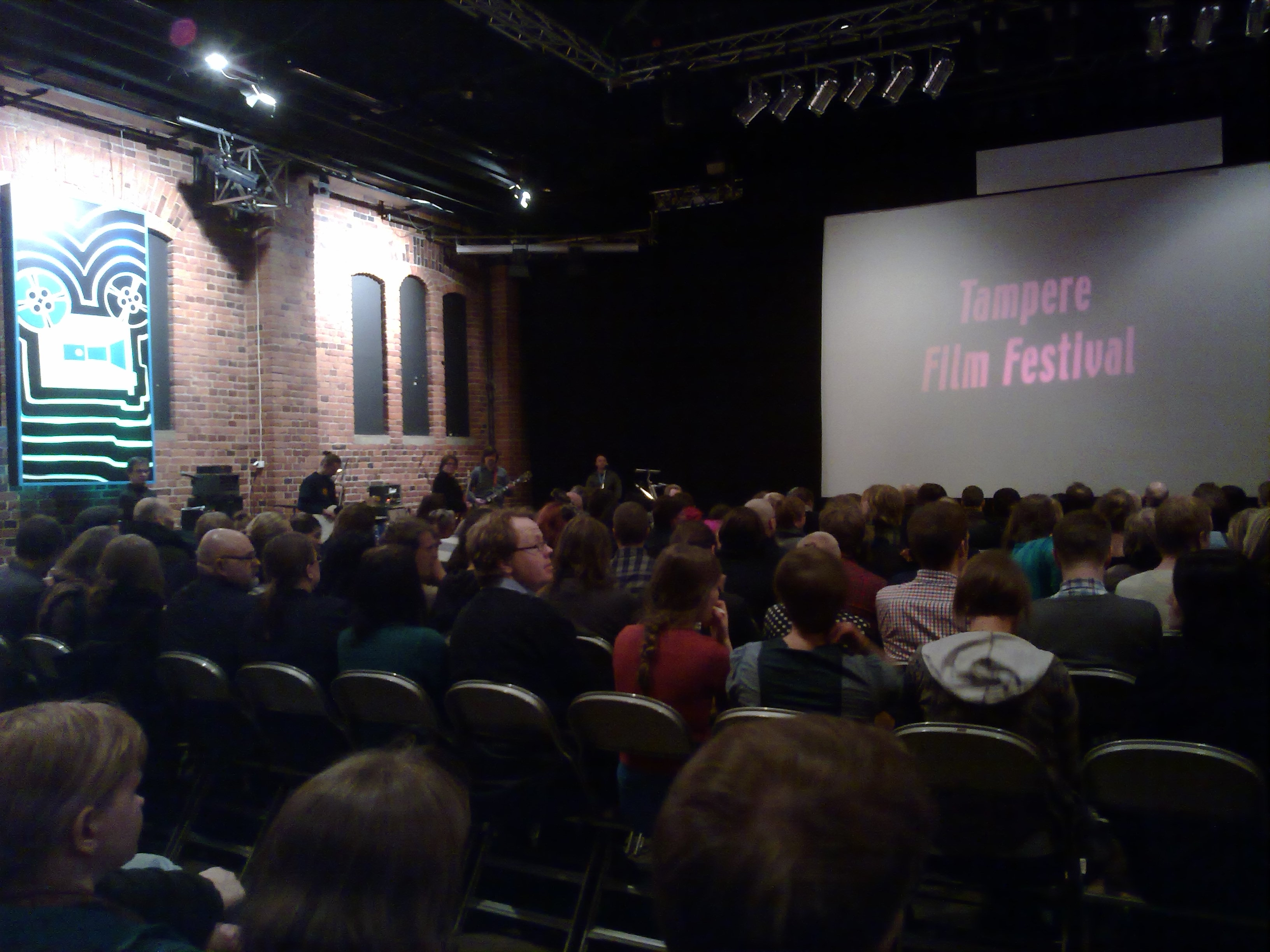
- Tampere Film Festival in 2011
- Location: Tampere, Finland
- Founded: 1969; 57 years ago
- Most recent: 2026
- Festival date: Opening: 4 March 2026; Closing: 8 March 2026
- Language: International
- Website: www.tamperefilmfestival.fi

Current: 56th
- 57th 55th

The Tampere Film Festival (Finnish: Tampereen elokuvajuhlat) is a short film festival held every March, mostly at the Finnkino Plevna movie theatre, in Tampere, Finland. It is accredited by the film producers' society FIAPF, and together with the short film festivals in Oberhausen and Clermont-Ferrand, it is among the most important European short film festivals.

The first festival was held in 1969. Since 1970, it has been held in its current form, which makes it the oldest short film festival in Northern Europe. Approximately 500 short films are screened during the five days of the festival each year.

On December 15, 2020, it was announced that the Tampere Film Festival will open a new international short film competition called Generation XYZ for 2021, which has been developed in cooperation with an American film production company XYZ Films. Selected films will be showcased at the 2021 Tampere Film Festival and judged by an independent jury, and the winning film will be given a prize in the amount of €2,000.

== Grand Prix winners ==
- 2026: Inherited Silence by Mariam Khatchvani (Georgia)
- 2025: El Canon by Martín Seeger (Chile)
- 2024: Wander to Wonder by Nina Gantz (Netherlands)
- 2023: Das Rotohr (Red Ears) by Paul Drey (Germany)
- 2021: Al-Sit by Suzannah Mirghani (Qatar, Sudan)
- 2020: Bab Sebta by Randa Maroufi (France, Morocco)
- 2019: Dulce by Angello Faccini, Guille Isa (United States, Colombia, Peru)
- 2018: Intimity von Elodie Dermange (dir.)
- 2017: Scris/Nescris – Written/Unwritten (dir. Adrian Silisteanu)
- 2014: BUM BUM, The baby of the Fisher by Ivan Maximov (Russia)
- 2013: The Mass of Men by Gabriel Gauchet (United Kingdom)
- 2012: Posledný Autobus by Martin Snopek, Ivana Laucikova (Slovakia)
- 2011: Händelse vid bank by Ruben Östlund (Sweden)
- 2010: Little Snow Animal (Lumikko) by Miia Tervo (Finland)
- 2009: Ahendu nde sapukai, by Pablo Lamar (Paraguay)
- 2008: Madame Tutli-Putli, Chris Lavis, Maciek Szczerbowski (Canada)
- 2007: Milan, by Michaela Kezele (Germany)
- 2006: Eût-elle été criminelle... (Even if She Had Been Criminal...) by Jean-Gabriel Periot (France)
- 2005: Through My Thick Glasses by Pjotr Sapegin (Norway/Canada)
- 2004: Utvecklingssamtal by Jens Jonsson (Sweden)
- 2003: The Projectionist by Michael Bates (Australia)
- 2002: The Invasion by Phil Mulloy (United Kingdom)
- 2001: Hyppääjä by PV Lehtinen (Finland)
- 2000: Four Corners by Ian Toews (Canada)
- 1999: Youfek by Mahvash Shaykh-Aleslami (Iran)
- 1998: Un Jour by Marie Paccou (France)
- 1997: Many Happy Returns by Marjut Rimminen (United Kingdom)
- 1996: Cicha przystan by Mariusz Malec (Poland)
- 1995: Quelcque chose de différent by Bruno Rolland (France)
- 1994: Wallace & Gromit in the Wrong Trousers by Nick Park (United Kingdom)
- 1993: Neonovi prikazki by Eldora Atanassova Traykova (Bulgaria)
- 1992: Året gjennom Bøfjord (A Year Along the Abandoned Road) by Morten Skallerud (Norway)
- 1991: De Craciun ne-am luat ratia de libertate by Catalina Fernoaga, Cornel Mihalache (Romania)
- 1990: Kitchen Sink by Alison Maclean (New Zealand)
- 1989: Devant le mur by Daisy Lamothe (France)
- 1988: Eine murul (Breakfast On The Grass) by Priit Pärn (the Soviet Union)
- 1987: Før gæsterne kommer by Jon Bang Carlsen (Denmark)
- 1986: Getekende mensen by Harriet Geelen (the Netherlands)
- 1985: Byker by Sirkka-Liisa Konttinen (United Kingdom)
- 1984: The Snowman by Dianne Jackson (United Kingdom)
- 1983: Mindrák by Miloš Macourek, Jaroslav Doubrava, Adolf Born (Czechoslovakia)
- 1982: En Stad Under Huden by Johan Donner (Sweden)
- 1981: Survival Run by Robert Charlton (the United States)
- 1980: An Encounter with Faces by Vinod Chopra (India)
- 1979: Noori by Mushtaq Ali Gazdar (Pakistan)
- 1978: A piacere — Tetszés szerint by Zoltán Huszárik (Hungary)
- 1977: Pojezd pamjati by Nikolai Serebrjakov (the Soviet Union)
- 1976: Campesinos by Marta Rodriguez, Jorge Silva (Colombia)
- 1975: Bölcs mesterek, okos szerkezetek by Vince Lakatos (Hungary/Bulgaria)
- 1974: La Primera página by Sebastian Alarcon (the Soviet Union)
- 1973: Chiracles by Marta Rodriguez, Jorge Silva (Colombia)
- 1971: Rantojen miehet by Hannu Peltomaa (Finland)
- 1970: 79 primaveras by Santiago Alvarez (Cuba)

== Best European Short Film ==
- 2018: Prisoner of Society by Rati Tsiteladze (Georgia)
- 2017: Scris/Nescris by Adrian Silisteanu (Romania)
- 2016: Small Talkby by Even Hafnor, Lisa Brooke Hansen (Norway)
