= Fernand Melgar =

Swiss actor, producer, director, and film editor

Fernand Melgar (born 1961 in Tangier) is a Swiss actor, producer, director and film editor. The son of Spanish immigrants, Melgar has lived in Lausanne since 1963. Melgar's documentary The Fortress (French: La forteresse), focusing on asylum seekers in Switzerland and the conditions they live in, garnered eleven international film festival awards.

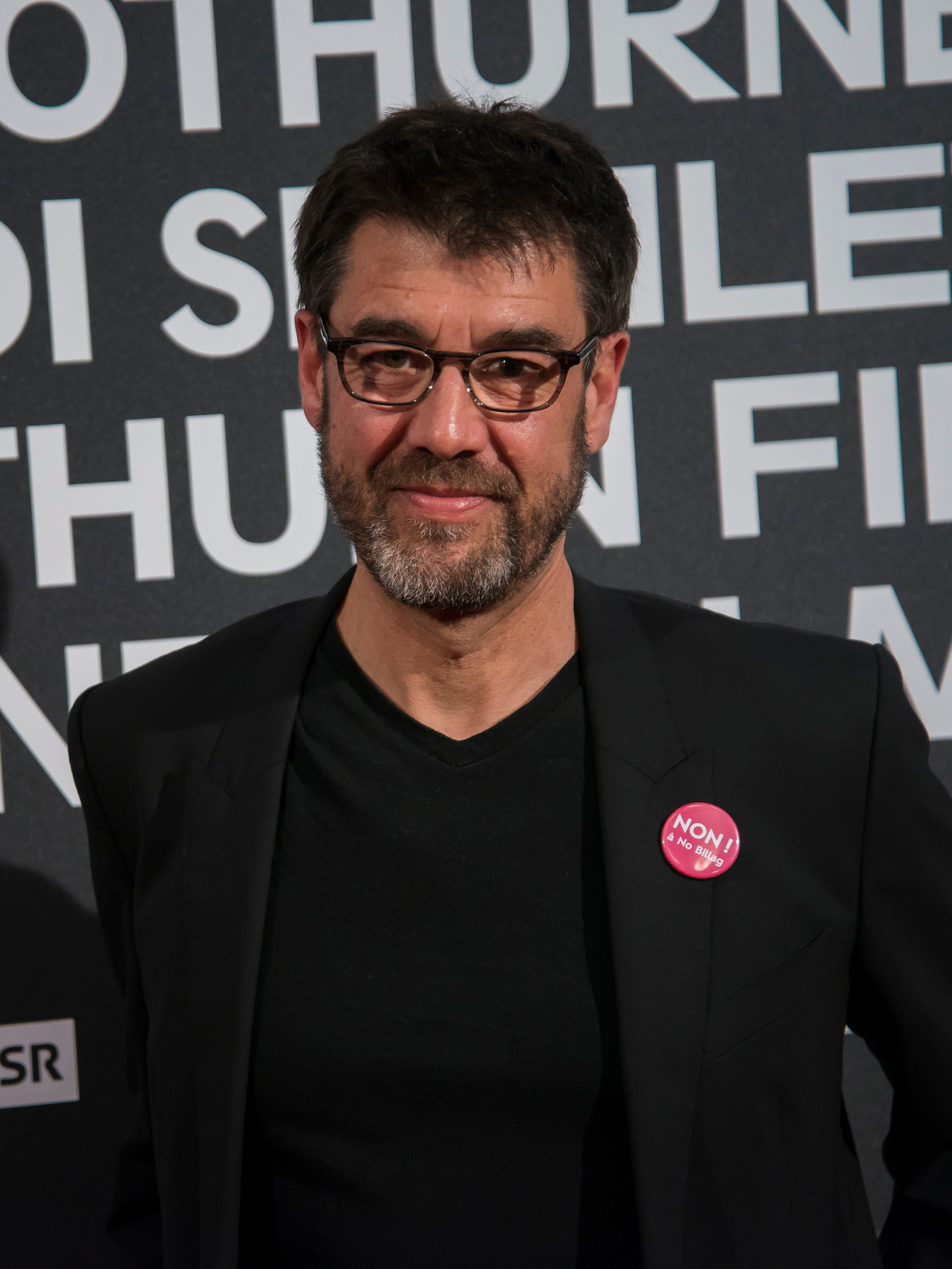

== Filmography (documentaries) ==
- 1983 Performances au Musée Deutsch
- 1986 Le musée imaginaire
- 1987 L'homme-nu
- 1990 Chroniques cathodiques (co-director)
- 1991 Je zappe donc je suis
- 1993 Album de famille
- 1997 Fou du jeu (film collective "Les frissons du hasard")
- 1998 Classe d'accueil
- 2000-2003 Collection Premier Jour ( Le Combat, L'Arrivée, L'Apprentissage, La Visite, La Vente, Le Stage, L'Attente, L'Inalpe, La Rentrée, L'Ordination)
- 2002 Remue-ménage
- 2003 L'histoire, c'est moi (À table, À l'arrière, “J”]
- 2005
  - Le puits
  - EXIT, le droit de mourir
  - Cartographies n° 6 – La vallée de la jeunesse
- 2008 The Fortress (French: La forteresse)
- 2011 Special Flight (French: Vol spécial)
- 2013 : Le monde est comme ça
- 2014 : L'Abri
- 2018 : À l'école des philosophes

== Awards ==
- 2008 "Camera-stylo" award at the Rencontres internationales du documentaire de Montréal for The Fortress (French: La forteresse)
- 2008 Grand Prize at the Tehran International Documentary Film Festival for The Fortress
- 2010 Silver Magnolia - Best Social Documentary at the MIDA Shanghai Festival
