= Lahti Institute of Design =

LAB Institute of Design and Fine Arts (Finnish: LAB Muotoiluinstituutti) is a faculty of LAB University of Applied Sciences in Finland, which is a large, multidisciplinary institution of higher education.

The LAB Institute of Design and Fine Arts is one of the largest Finnish schools in its field. It has the most bachelors' level design students of any school in Finland. The Institute of Design and Fine Arts has a wide offering of different design specialisations from Graphic Design to Interior Architecture to UI/UX Design.

The design and arts education at the LAB University of Applied Sciences carries on the traditions of the Lahti Institute of Design and Imatra School of Fine Arts. It has bachelors and masters degree programmes on campuses at the cities of Lahti and Lappeenranta.

== History ==
The history of the Lahti Institute of Design dates back to 1899, when an agricultural crafts college called Itä-Hämeen maamieskäsityökoulu was founded in Lahti. The establishment aimed at meeting the contemporary demands of educating young men with the necessary theoretical and practical skills in agricultural crafts.

In 1908 the school was renamed Lahden kotiteollisuuskoulu and again in 1936 it became Lahden mieskotiteollisuuskoulu. As teacher education became a part of the school's offering it was renamed Lahden mieskotiteollisuusopisto in 1945. The word "mies" was dropped from the name in 1954 as gender equality had become more of an issue in the Finnish society. Women were first admitted as students at the college in the 70s.

In 1971, through a merger of 3 schools, a new college was founded in Lahti with the name of Lahden taideoppilaitokset. Later called Lahden taide- ja käsiteollisuusoppilaitos, this college joined together the above mentioned crafts college, the Lahti Art School (later known as Lahden Taideinstituutti) and the Helsinki Goldsmith School (Helsingin Kultaseppäkoulu, founded in 1938 by the Finnish Goldsmith's Association).

In 1989 the college got the name it is still known by: Lahden muotoiluinstituutti (or in English: Lahti Institute of Design). The new name distinguished the college from its rivals but also reflected its broadening offering of study fields. Not only wood and metal artisans and designers, but also photographers, graphic designers and clothing designers were educated. Later also interior designers, furniture designers and videographers got their departments at the Institute of Design.

From 1992 the Institute of Design has been a faculty of a university of applied sciences in Lahti. Its departments have evolved with the times. The digitalization of communication brought with it the department of Multimedia production (later under the title Media Design). Some years later the Packaging Design department was founded (later Packaging and Brand Design) and also a separate Vehicle Design department was run for several years, though later it was merged back into the Industrial Design department.

== Notable alumni ==
Lahti Institute of Design boasts a strong status in the Nordic design industry. The school has during its history educated many professionals in key positions around the world in such companies as Honda, Toyota, Apple, Marimekko, Nokia and H&M.
