= Le Déchaussé =

- Directed by: Laurence Attali
- Screenplay by: Laurence Attali
- Produced by: AUTOPRODUCTION, INA, ARTE
- Starring: Cheikh Lô, Maylis Guiard Schmid, Oumou Sy
- Cinematography: Jean-Michel Humeau
- Edited by: Laurence Attali
- Music by: Cheick Lô
- Release date: 2002
- Running time: 35 minutes
- Countries: France; Senegal

Le Déchaussé is a 2002 film. It completes Laurence Attali's Trilogy of Love. The first two films were Même le Vent (1999) and Baobab (2000).

== Synopsis ==
Everything started at the lighthouse bar, during Booz's concert. Ben, the trumpet player, dies onstage. The next day, his wife Esther places Ben's trumpet on his grave and taking Booz's hand, she says: "Now you must take care of me".

== Awards ==
- Beaumarchais, Dakar 2003
- Reus 2004
- Roma Stelle del Deserto 2004
