= Finnish Goldsmith's Association =

The Finnish Goldsmith's Association (Finnish: Suomen Kultaseppien Liitto) was founded in 1905 in Helsinki, Finland. They promoted a quality shop system in 1994. The organisation published a book to commemorate its centenary in 2005.
