= Anne Meskanen =

Finnish diplomat

Anne Meskanen is a Finnish diplomat. In 2024, she is Head of Mission at Finland’s Embassy in Beirut.

She was the Finnish Ambassador to Kabul, Afghanistan from September 1, 2015. The mission was closed in March 2017 when a terrorist attack took place nearby.

Between 2018-2020 she worked as an advisor at the Ministry of Foreign Affairs. She then served as the Deputy Head of Mission for the European Union Advisory Mission in Iraq from November 2020, before taking the post in Beirut in September 2022.

Meskanen has worked in Finland at the Ministry for Foreign Affairs' General Global Affairs Unit.

== Biography ==
Meskanen earned a master's degree in political science from the University of Helsinki before working as a journalist and foreign correspondent for the Demari Newspaper.
