= Ending on a High Note Tour =

2010 concert tour by a-ha

- Tour by a-ha
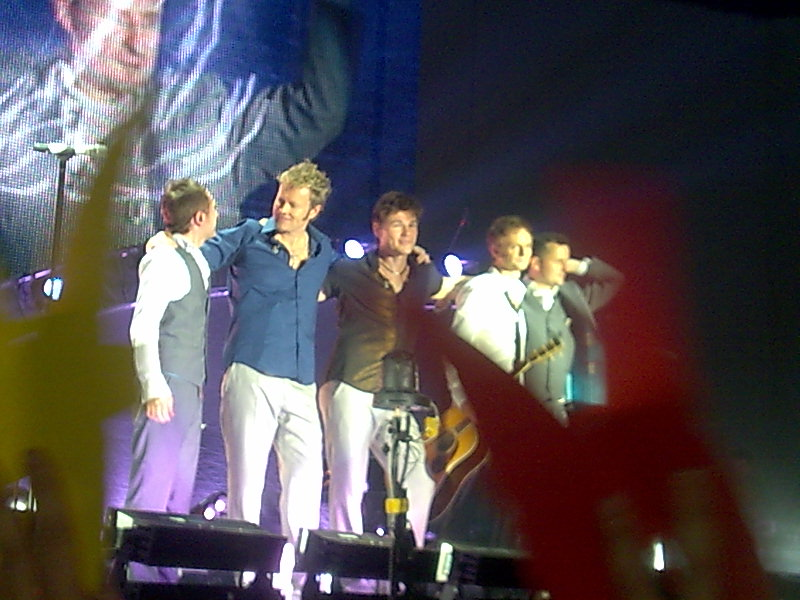
- A-ha at Palacio Vistalegre in Madrid, Spain
- Associated albums: Foot of the Mountain; 25
- Start date: March 4, 2010
- End date: December 4, 2010
- Legs: 5
- No. of shows: 9 in South America; 7 in North America; 2 in Asia; 55 in Europe; 73 in total

a-ha concert chronology
- Foot of the Mountain Tour (2009); Ending on a High Note Tour (2010); Cast in Steel Tour (2015–16)

Ending on a High Note Tour was a worldwide concert tour by Norwegian synth-pop band a-ha in support of the group's ninth studio album, Foot of the Mountain, which was released in June 2009 as well as the compilation 25 which was released in July 2010. It was also a farewell tour, as the band announced, in 2009, their decision to split after a worldwide concert tour in 2010.

The tour began on March 4 at the Estadio Luna Park in Buenos Aires, Argentina and ended on 4 December in Oslo Spektrum in Oslo, Norway, having visited many cities in the United States, Germany, the United Kingdom and several European countries. The sold out a-ha show in Santiago, Chile, originally scheduled for 6 March, was rescheduled for 23 March following a major earthquake.

Due to demand, the a-ha concert on March 16 in Centro de Convenções (Brasília, Brazil) was moved to a larger venue, Ginásio Nilson Nelson. Also the capacity for the concerts in Oslo and Bergen in August in Norway had to expand its capacity with 9000 additional tickets to a total of 25 000 tickets for each show.

== Background ==
On 15 October 2009, through a press release from the official website of the group, "has stated that after his latest album Foot of the Mountain, with the success enjoyed by both commercial and critical acclaim, had decided that now was the time of final dissolution of the band. In a statement on the news the band thanked all the cooperation and support received throughout their career, they talked and put an end with these words:

"We've literally lived the ultimate boy's adventure tale, through a longer, more rewarding career than anyone could hope for.
Doing this now will give us a chance to get more involved in other meaningful aspects of life, be it humanitarian work, politics, or whatever else—and of course through new constellations in the field of art and music. We are retiring as a band, not as individuals.
Change is always difficult and it is easy to get set in one's ways. Now it is time to move on."

— a-ha, October 2009

== Stadium tour of Norway ==
For the 6 shows in Oslo between the 21st of August and the 11th of September, a-ha exclusevly built a special stage rig, the largest rig ever put up in Norway so far. The stage was 1,200 Sq meters, weighing over 1,500 tonnes. The rig included a video wall of 600 Sq meters. The stage took 200 men, 4 days to build.

== Australian leg controversy ==
There has been much controversy surrounding the supposed Australian leg of the tour. Before an official announcement of tour dates it was suggested on a-ha's official website that Australian tour dates would be included in their final world tour.

"January will bring a-ha back to Australia for the first time since their first world tour, which opened in Perth, Australia on June 3, 1986."

— a-ha, July 2009

As further tour dates were announced throughout Europe, North and South America, none were announced for Australia. It was later suggested through the a-ha fan community, West of the Moon, that Australia would not be included in a-ha's final world tour. This turn of events has sparked outrage amongst Australian based fans. Had a-ha returned to Australia, it would have marked their first visit there since they played their first live concerts in 1986 after the initial success of "Take On Me".

== Set list ==
The set list of the concert in the Luna Park on March 4, 2010.

1. "The Bandstand"
2. "Foot of the Mountain"
3. "Analogue"
4. "Forever Not Yours"
5. "Summer Moved On"
6. "Move to Memphis"
7. "Crying in the Rain"
8. "Stay on These Roads"
9. "The Blood That Moves the Body"
10. "The Living Daylights"
11. "Early Morning"
12. "And You Tell Me"
13. "Scoundrel Days"
14. "Cry Wolf"
15. "We're Looking for the Whales"
16. "Manhattan Skyline"
17. "I've Been Losing You"
18. "Living a Boys Adventure Tale"
19. "Hunting High and Low"
20. "Train of Thought"
21. "The Sun Always Shines on T.V."
22. "Take On Me"

The setlist of the concert in the Ullevaal Stadium at August 21, 2010.

1. "The Sun Always Shines on T.V."
2. "Move to Memphis"
3. "The Blood That Moves the Body"
4. "Scoundrel Days"
5. "Stay on These Roads"
6. "Manhattan Skyline"
7. "Hunting High and Low"
8. "The Bandstand"
9. "We're Looking for the Whales"
10. "Butterfly, Butterfly (The Last Hurrah)"
11. "(Seemingly) Nonstop July"
12. "Crying in the Rain"
13. "Minor Earth, Major Sky"
14. "Forever Not Yours"
15. "Summer Moved On"
16. "I've Been Losing You"
17. "Foot of the Mountain"
18. "Cry Wolf"
19. "Analogue"
20. "The Living Daylights"
21. "Take On Me"

Other songs performed:

- "The Swing of Things"
- "Touchy"
- "You Are the One"
- At the final concert (4 December) they performed the Everly Brothers song "Bowling Green" in the final encore, just before "Take On Me".

== Tour dates ==
Date	City	Country	Venue
South America
March 4, 2010	Buenos Aires	Argentina	Luna Park, Buenos Aires
March 9, 2010	Bauru	Brazil	Alameda Quality Center
March 10, 2010	São Paulo	Brazil	Credicard Hall
March 13, 2010	Rio de Janeiro	Brazil	Citibank Hall
March 14, 2010	Belo Horizonte	Brazil	Chevrolet Hall
March 16, 2010	Brasília	Brazil	Nilson Nelson Gymnasium
March 18, 2010	Recife	Brazil	Chevrolet Hall
March 20, 2010	Fortaleza	Brazil	Siara Hall
March 23, 2010	Santiago	Chile	Movistar Arena
North America
May 6, 2010	New York City	United States	Nokia Theatre Times Square
May 7, 2010	New York City	United States	Nokia Theatre Times Square
May 8, 2010	New York City	United States	Nokia Theatre Times Square
May 10, 2010	Toronto	Canada	Massey Hall
May 13, 2010	Chicago	United States	Riviera Theatre
May 15, 2010	Los Angeles	United States	Club Nokia
May 16, 2010	Los Angeles	United States	Club Nokia
Europe
May 28, 2010	Mönchengladbach	Germany	Warsteiner HockeyPark
May 29, 2010	Trier	Germany	Trier Arena
May 30, 2010	Stadtallendorf	Germany	Hessentagsarena
June 1, 2010	Kiel	Germany	Sparkassen-Arena
July 14, 2010	Budapest	Hungary	Budapest Sports Arena
July 16, 2010	Linz	Austria	Clam Castle
July 17, 2010	Zürich	Switzerland	Dolder Eisbahn (Live at Sunset)
July 18, 2010	Salem	Germany	Schloß Salem
July 23, 2010	Emmendingen	Germany	Schloßplatz
July 24, 2010	Halle	Germany	Gerry Weber Stadion
July 25, 2010	Dresden	Germany	Filmnächte am Elbufer
Asia
August 7, 2010	Tokyo	Japan	Chiba Marine Stadium
August 8, 2010	Osaka	Japan	Summer Sonic Festival
Europe
August 21, 2010	Oslo	Norway	Ullevaal Stadion
August 28, 2010	Bergen	Norway	Brann Stadion
September 2, 2010	Stavanger	Norway	Rått og Råde Festival
September 3, 2010	Tromsø	Norway	Døgnvill Festival
September 4, 2010	Trondheim	Norway	Lerkendal Stadion
September 11, 2010	Kristiansand	Norway	Sør Arena
October 4, 2010	Oslo	Norway	Oslo Concert Hall
October 6, 2010	London	England	Heaven
October 8, 2010	London	England	Royal Albert Hall
October 10, 2010	Amsterdam	Netherlands	Heineken Music Hall
October 11, 2010	Brussels	Belgium	Forest National
October 12, 2010	Paris	France	Zénith de Paris
October 14, 2010	Madrid	Spain	Palacio Vistalegre
October 15, 2010	Barcelona	Spain	Palau Sant Jordi
October 17, 2010	Basel	Switzerland	St. Jakobshalle
October 18, 2010	Munich	Germany	Olympiahalle
October 19, 2010	Stuttgart	Germany	Porsche-Arena
October 21, 2010	Nuremberg	Germany	Nuremberg Arena
October 22, 2010	Leipzig	Germany	Arena Leipzig
October 23, 2010	Rostock	Germany	Stadthalle Rostock
October 25, 2010	Braunschweig	Germany	Volkswagen Halle
October 26, 2010	Mannheim	Germany	SAP Arena
October 28, 2010	Hamburg	Germany	O_{2} World
October 29, 2010	Berlin	Germany	O_{2} World
November 1, 2010	Riga	Latvia	Arena Riga
November 2, 2010	Vilnius	Lithuania	Siemens Arena
November 4, 2010	Kyiv	Ukraine	International Exhibition Centre
November 6, 2010	Minsk	Belarus	Palace of Sports
November 9, 2010	Moscow	Russia	Olympic Stadium
November 11, 2010	Saint Petersburg	Russia	Ice Palace
November 15, 2010	Brighton	England	Brighton Centre
November 16, 2010	Newcastle	England	Metro Radio Arena
November 17, 2010	Glasgow	Scotland	Clyde Auditorium
November 19, 2010	Birmingham	England	LG Arena
November 20, 2010	Manchester	England	Evening News Arena
November 21, 2010	Nottingham	England	Trent FM Arena
November 23, 2010	Sheffield	England	Sheffield Arena
November 25, 2010	Cardiff	Wales	Cardiff International Arena
November 26, 2010	Bournemouth	England	Bournemouth International Centre
November 27, 2010	London	England	Wembley Arena
November 30, 2010	Oslo	Norway	Oslo Spektrum
December 2, 2010	Oslo	Norway	Oslo Spektrum
December 3, 2010	Oslo	Norway	Oslo Spektrum
December 4, 2010	Oslo	Norway	Oslo Spektrum
