= The Diver (2001 film) =

2001 film

- Directed by: PV Lehtinen
- Written by: PV Lehtinen
- Produced by: PV Lehtinen
- Cinematography: Jyri Hakala
- Edited by: PV Lehtinen
- Music by: Moby
- Release date: March 2001
- Running time: 21 minutes
- Country: Finland
- Language: Finnish

The Diver (Finnish: Hyppääjä) is a 2001 Finnish short film directed by PV Lehtinen. It is an ode to diving and the aesthetics of movement. The film focuses on Helge Wasenius (born 1927), the grand old man of diving, who competed in two Olympic Games and performed clown dives. Lehtinen has said that the protagonist, Helge Wasenius, was his neighbour and childhood hero. When he started planning the film, an image of Wasenius hanging by his feet from the ten-meter diving tower of Helsinki Swimming Stadium was embedded in his head. The diving sequences in the film have been compared to Leni Riefenstahl. Lehtinen has said he was inspired by Herb Ritts’ photographs of divers more than Riefensthal.

== Critical reviews ==
Variety International Film Guide wrote following about the film: "A thoughtful voiceover and a skilful blend of archive and dramatised footage create a meditative mood, emphasised by touches of ambient music, giving the spectator space to reflect on his own emotions".

== Awards ==
The Diver won the Grand Prix and other main prizes at the Tampere Film Festival 2001.

Year	Association	Country	Award category	Status
2001	Tampere Film Festival	Finland	Grand Prix, International Competition	Won
2001	Tampere Film Festival	Finland	Main Prize, Finnish Short Film Under 30 Minutes	Won
2001	Tampere Film Festival	Finland	Prize of the Youth Jury, Finnish Short Film Under 30 Minutes	Won
2001	Tampere Film Festival	Finland	Audience Award, International Competition	Won
2001	Tampere Film Festival	Finland	Risto Jarva Award	Won
2001	Festival du nouveau cinéma	Canada	Best Short Film, Loup Argenté	Won
2001	Corto Imola Film Festival	Italy	Best International Film, Special Mention	Won
2001	Brest European Short Film Festival	France	Best Short Film, Young Jury Award	Won
2001	International Documentary Film Festival Amsterdam	The Netherlands	Special Mention, Silver Wolf	Won
2002	Finland´s State Quality Award	Finland	Quality Award	Won
2002	Maremetraggio International Short Film Festival	Italy	Best Foreign Language Film	Won
2002	Montecatini Filmvideo - International Short Film Festival	Italy	Best Film, Heron - Youth Jury Award	Won
2002	Montecatini Filmvideo - International Short Film Festival	Italy	Silver Heron	Won
2002	Palermo International Sport Film Festival	Italy	Best Film, Paladino d'Oro	Won
2006	Sport Movies & TV – Milano International FICTS Fest	Italy	Best Movie, Guirlande d'Honneur	Won
