= Séverine Cornamusaz =

Swiss-French film director

Séverine Cornamusaz (born 1975, Lausanne, Switzerland) is a Swiss-French film director. In 2009 her first film Cœur animal won the Prix du cinéma suisse Best Film, and Best Actor was won by Antonio Buil.
