= Saad Salman =

Iraqi-French film director (born 1950)

- سعد سلمان
- Born: 1950 (age 75–76); Baghdad, Iraq
- Occupation: Director

Saad Salman (Note: Arabic: سعد سلمان, romanized: Saʿd Salmān) (born 1950) is an Iraqi-French film director. He filmed Baghdad On/Off, a documentary filmed when Saddam Hussein was in power. He has been exiled in Paris since 1976. He attended a School of the Art schools of Baghdad in 1969, he later left Iraq for Lebanon in 1974 but had to leave because of the civil war taking place at the time, forcing him to settle in Paris in 1976.

== Filmography ==
- 1983 - En raison des circonstances
- 2003 - Baghdad On/Off
