= Morten Skallerud =

Norwegian cinematographer and film director

Morten Skallerud (born 14 July 1954) is a Norwegian cinematographer and film director. He runs Camera Magica, a film production company in Oslo.

He won the Amanda Award for Best Short Film with 1991's A Year Along the Abandoned Road.

== Released films ==
- A Year Along the Abandoned Road, 1991 12 minutes
- Ti tusen år under jorda, 1995
- Majestät brauchen Sonne, 1999
- Arktisk lys 32 minutes
- Nordlyset danser 8:30 minutes
- Smale spor av et århundre, 2003 4:30 minutes
