= PV Lehtinen =

Finnish film director

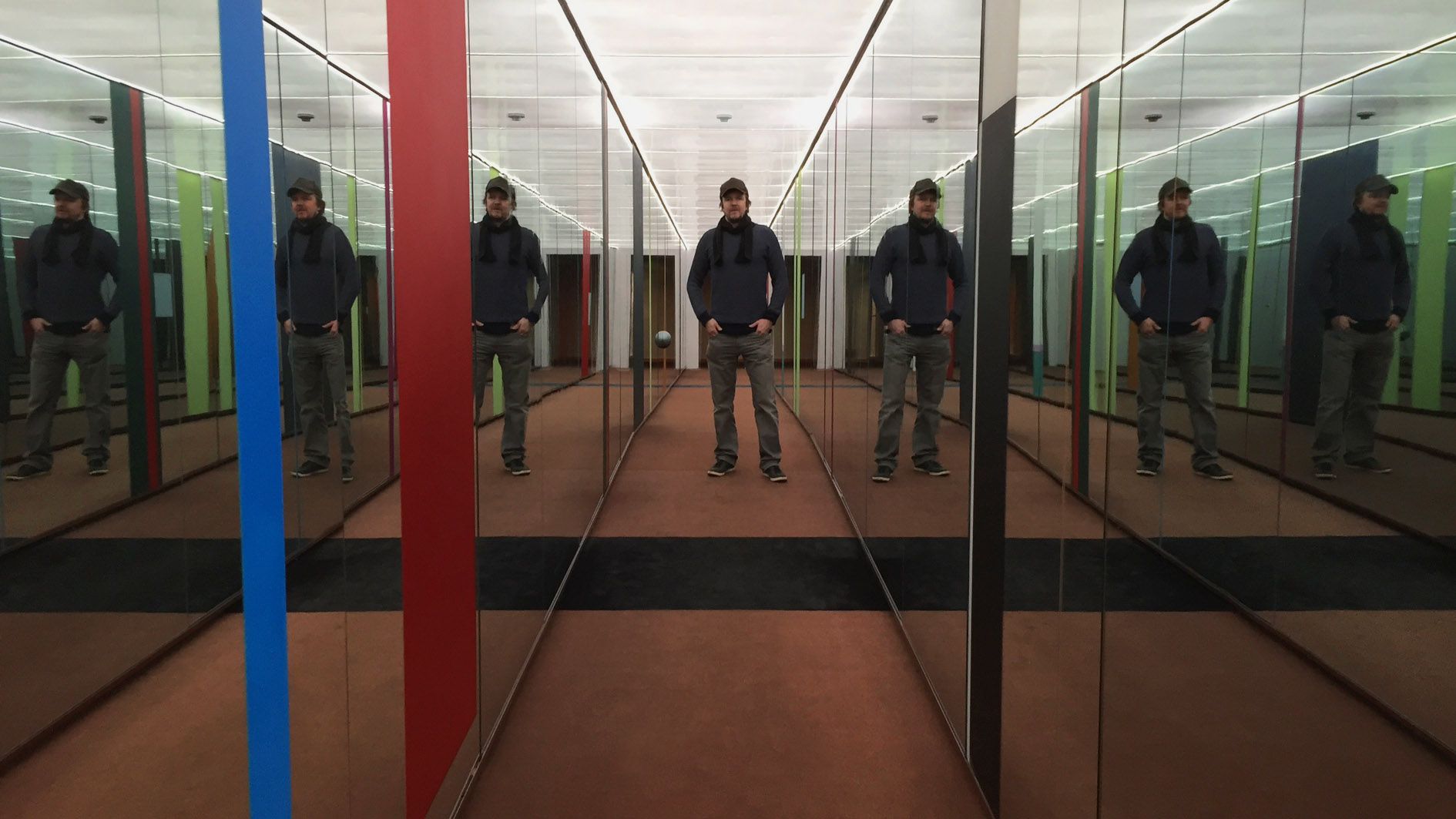

PV Lehtinen (born 1969) is a Finnish film director, screenwriter and producer.

== Education and Career ==
He graduated from the University of Art and Design Helsinki as a director. His short film The Diver (Hyppääjä, 2000) won the Grand Prix and other main prizes at the Tampere Film Festival 2001. The Diver continued to win awards in other festivals with the last award won in 2006 at Milano International FICTS Fest.

Lehtinen had a retrospective screening of his water-themed films in Germany at Ludwigsburg European Short Film Biennale in 2005 and Regensburg Short Film Week in 2007. In 2011, his short films had an open-air screening at the Helsinki Swimming Stadium as part of the annual Helsinki Festival.

In his many short films, water often plays an important role, however he has indicated that the subject of the film determines if water will play a role. Lehtinen has also directed music videos for the electronic music group RinneRadio and directed commercials.

== Selected filmography ==
=== Short films ===
- The Diver / Hyppääjä (2000)
- Sirkka (2001)
- The Crawl / Krooli (2004)
- Keidas (2007)
- My Superhero / Supermään (2010)
- Soul Catcher / Sielunsieppaaja (2011)
- Hietsu (2014)
- Dance On Thin Ice / Tanssi heikolla jäällä (2017)
- Allas (2022)
- Nightswims / Yöui (2023)
- IURIMA – A Tale of Three Fishermen / IURIMA – taru kolmesta kalastajasta (2025)

=== Music videos ===
- RinneRadio – Airo (2003)
- RinneRadio – Val (2004)
- RinneRadio – Krump (2011)
