= A Year Along the Abandoned Road =

- Directed by: Morten Skallerud
- Written by: Morten Skallerud
- Produced by: Morten Skallerud
- Cinematography: Morten Skallerud
- Edited by: Morten Skallerud
- Music by: Jan Garbarek
- Production company: Camera Magica
- Distributed by: Oro Film / Norsk Filmklubbforbund (Norway); Norwegian Film Institute (internationally)
- Release date: June 1991
- Running time: 12 min.
- Country: Norway
- Language: None

A Year Along the Abandoned Road (Norwegian: Året gjennom Børfjord) is a Norwegian short film shot over a period of 105 days in 1988/1989 and released in 1991. Directed by Morten Skallerud, the film was shot in Super Panavision 70 (65 mm negative) and shows a whole year passing by in Børfjord in Hasvik Municipality, Norway, at 50,000 times the normal speed in just 12 minutes. The camera was moved slightly each day, and so the film gives the viewer the impression of seamlessly travelling around the fjord as the year goes along, each day compressed into a few seconds.

The film which premiered at the Kortfilmfestivalen Grimstad in June 1991, has been screened at over 300 film festivals throughout the world and won 12 different awards, among which the Norwegian Amandaprisen for best short film in 1991, and the Grand Prix at the Tampere Film Festival in 1992. The film is traditionally the opening movie of the annual 70 mm film festival held at the Cinemateket film club in Oslo.

In 2002 director Jesper Hiro used footage from the film in a-ha's "Lifelines" music video.

== See also ==
- List of 70 mm films
