= Martin Landquist =

Swedish musician

Martin Landquist is a Swedish music producer, recording artist, remixer and songwriter working under the name Nåid. He has produced albums for artists such as a-ha, Jay-Jay Johanson, Linda Sundblad and Kent, and has remixed tracks for artists including The Cardigans. He also recorded a special instrumental version of his song "Better Day" for the Eurovision Song Contest 2000 in Stockholm. Martin Landquist is also the composer of the Eurovision Song Contest 2016 postcards suite.

He is also a member of the bands Peking Laundry with Martin Sköld from Kent and Snowracer with Dregen from Backyard Babies, Amir Chamdin from Infinite Mass and Brady Blade.

== Discography ==
Albums released as Nåid

- Nåid (1996)
- Waking Up (2000)
- Varanasi (2007)
