= Come Along =

Come Along may refer to:

- "Come Along", song by Elvis Presley from the album Frankie and Johnny
- "Come Along", song by Maurice Williams and the Zodiacs from the album Stay with Maurice Williams & The Zodiacs
- Come Along (album), 2001 album by Swedish singer Titiyo
  - "Come Along" (Titiyo song), title track from above album by Titiyo
- "Come Along", a 2018 song from Cosmo Sheldrake's album The Much Much How How and I
- "Come Along", a 2001 song from Gotthard's album Homerun
- Come-along, a mechanical pulling device

== See also ==
- Come Along with Me (disambiguation)
- "Come Along, John, an alternative title for the 1843 song "Walk Along John"
- Come Along Now (album), album by Greek singer Despina Vandi
  - "Come Along Now", 2004 title song by Phoebus featuring Despina Vandi
