= Kool Kojak =

American music producer

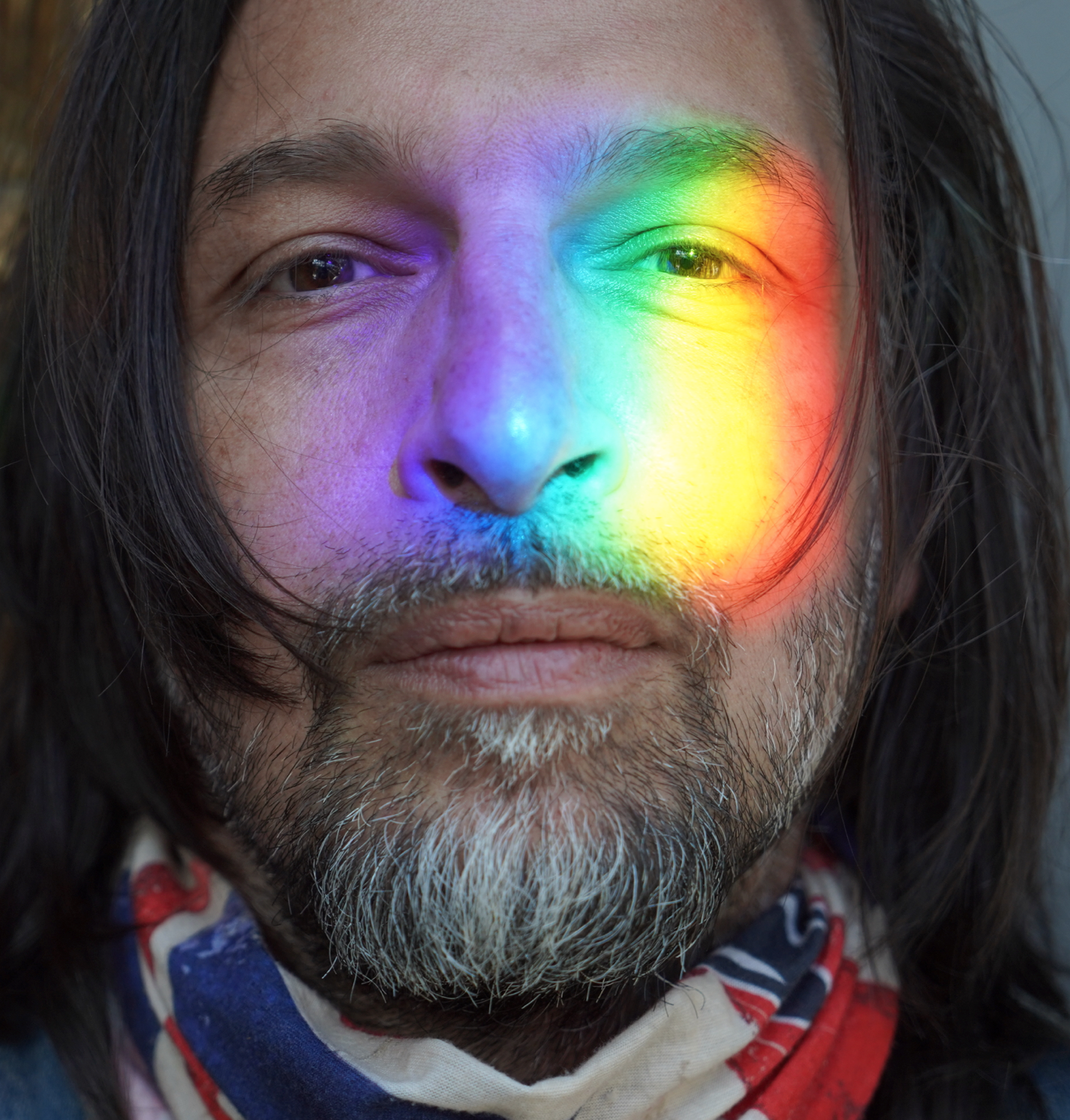

Background information
- Born: Allan Peter Grigg; July 31, 1972 (age 53); Worcester, Massachusetts, U.S.
- Origin: Cubatão, São Paulo, Brazil
- Genres: Latin; hip hop; samba; reggae fusion; funk; bossa nova; electro; zouk; charanga; rock
- Occupations: Songwriter; record producer; composer; painter; graffiti artist; sculptor
- Years active: 1989–present
- Labels: TRIZM; KojakTrax; IYF Productions
- Website: www.instagram.com/kooolkojak

Allan Peter Grigg (born July 31, 1972), better known by his stage name Kool Kojak and stylized as "KoOoLkOjAk", is an American songwriter and record producer notable for music in Spider-Man: Into the Spider-Verse, co-writing and co-producing Flo Rida's #1 Billboard hit single "Right Round," Doja Cat's hit single "Cyber Sex," Nicki Minaj's hit single "Va Va Voom," The Boss Baby Theme, and Ke$ha's top 10 single "Blow." Kool Kojak has written and produced for artists such as Sean Paul, Yelle, DMX, Waka Flocka Flame, Onyx, Travis Barker, Kim Petras, Ed Helms, Britney Spears, Jesse & Joy, Andy Milonakis, Icona Pop, Matisyahu, comedian Chelsea Peretti, N.A.S.A., Dirt Nasty, Lordz of Brooklyn, Ursula 1000, Phil Greiss, and Warren G, among others. Kool Kojak has created original music for many major motion pictures. He was a featured producer on the Simon Cowell TV program X Factor and has appeared as himself on the Nickelodeon show Victorious. He has won two ASCAP Pop Awards and one ASCAP Urban Award, a WormTown Sound Award, and has been awarded the Key to the City of Worcester, Massachusetts.

== Early life and music career ==
Kool Kojak was born and raised in Worcester, Massachusetts, where he created the 1980s underground cassette legends IYF Productions. After studying under Archie Shepp at the University of Massachusetts, Kojak began professionally creating music in 1995, DJing, playing in bands, and producing hip-hop records in Manhattan, Brooklyn, and Harlem. His first commercial success was as composer and producer of the Brazilian multi-platinum selling #1 Supla album O Charada Brasileiro. This album sold 16 million copies on the Brazilian bootleg street market.

In 2009, Kojak signed with Dr. Luke's Prescription Songs and began co-producing various tracks with the producer.

Kojak served as musical director and performer for the live Supla show, which took place at Rock in Rio 3, in Rio de Janeiro, Brazil, in 2001.

== Select production discography ==
Year	Artist	Song	Album	Role
1989	In Your Face Productions		Music From The Plaid Gnu	Rapper/Producer/Engineer
1996	Average White Boys	"Billy Dee Williams Butter Sculpture"	Knuckle Sandwich	Co-Writer/Producer
1997	Rump Rangers featuring Heather Hunter and Kool Keith	"Toot Toot Beep Beep"		Remixer
1998	Binger The Voyager	"Sweet Taste of Nothing"		Co-Producer
1998	Supla Zoo	"Bossa Furiosa"	Album	Co-Producer/ Composer / Rapper
1999	Ursula 1000	"Arrastao"		Co-Writer/Producer with Ursula 1000 and Dr. Luke
2000	Supla	"O Charada Brasileiro"	#1 Album	Co-Writer/Producer
2002	Holly Tree	"Greatest Shits"	album	Co-Producer
2002	Average White Boys	"Knuckle Sandwich"	album	Producer
2004	Average White Boys	"Keg Pahty"	House Of Booze	Co-Writer/Producer
2005	Being Bobby Brown (TV show)			Music producer
2007	George of the Jungle (TV show)	Theme song		Producer and performed with J-Radical
2007	Urban Legend		Tranquilidad Cubana	Co-Writer/Producer
2007	Three 6 Mafia featuring Tech N9ne	"Shots"	Laws of Power	Backing Vocals
2009	Ursula 1000	"Zombies"	Mystics	Co-Writer/Rapper
2010	Miranda Cosgrove	"There Will Be Tears"	Sparks Fly	Co-Writer/Co-Producer with Ammo
2010	Miranda Cosgrove	"Kissin' U"	Sparks Fly	Co-Producer with Ammo
2009	Shwayze	"Maneatrr"	Let It Beat	Co-writer/Producer
2011	Hitomi featuring Rivers Cuomo	"Rollin Wit Da Homies"	Spirit	Producer/Co-writer
2011	Dirt Nasty featuring Too Short and Warren G	"Milk, Milk, Lemonade"	Nasty as I Wanna Be	Writer/Producer (leaked)
2012	Victoria Justice and Ariana Grande	"L.A.Boyz"	Victorious 3.0	Co-Writer/Co-Producer
2012	Victoria Justice	"Faster Than Boys"	Victorious 3.0	Co-Writer/Producer
2012	Leon Thomas III	"365 Days"	Victorious 3.0 (Deluxe version)	Co-writer/Producer
2012	Leon Thomas III	"Countdown"	Victorious 2.0	Co-writer/Producer
2011	Victoria Justice	"Best Friend's Brother	Victorious: Music from the Hit TV Show	Co-Writer/Producer
2010	Nneka (singer)	"Heartbeat (KooLkOjAk remix)"	Single	Remixer
2011	Kumi Koda	"4 Times"	Single	Producer
2009	Andy Milonakis	"Let Me Twitter Dat"	Single	Co-writer/Producer
2011	Dirt Nasty featuring Too $hort, Warren G, Andy Milonakis and Benji Hughes	"As Nasty As I Wanna Be"	Nasty as I Wanna Be	Co-Writer/Producer
2011	Dirt Nasty featuring Kesha	"Boombox"	Nasty as I Wanna Be	Co-Writer/Producer
2009	*N.A.S.A. featuring Kanye West, Lykke Li, and Santo Gold	"Gifted"	The Spirit of Apollo	Co-writer/Co-Producer
2009	N.A.S.A. featuring Kool Kojak	"O Pato"	The Spirit of Apollo	Co-writer/Performer
2010	Matisyahu	"Miracle"	Single	Co-Writer/Producer
2011	Travis Barker	"Can A Drumma Get Some KoOoLkOjAk SuRfPuNk mEgAmIx"	Single	Remixer
2011	Travis Barker featuring Bun B and Tech N9ne	"Raw Shit"	Give the Drummer Some	Co-Writer/Co-Producer with Travis Barker
2011	Travis Barker featuring Snoop Dogg, Ludacris, E-40 and Dev	"Knockin'"	Give the Drummer Some	Co-Writer/Co-Producer with Travis Barker
2009	Flo Rida	"Right Round"	R.O.O.T.S.	Co-Writer/Co-Producer with Dr. Luke
2010	Kesha	"Blow"	Cannibal	Co-Writer/Co-Producer with Dr. Luke and Max Martin
2010	Lights Over Paris	"Fallin'"	Single	Co-Writer/Producer with J Kash & Robb Mahweenie
	Roberto Carlos	"Jesus Cristo (Zegon Kojeazy Official Remix)"	Single	Producer with DJ Zegon of N.A.S.A.
2012	Ariana Grande	"Voodoo Love"	Single	Co-writer/Producer
	David Choe		Dirty Hands (DVD)	Producer Kojak Beatz
2012	Shyne		Gangland Mixtape	Producer
2012	Michel Telo featuring Becky G	"Ai Se Eu Te Pego"	Single – UK Remix	Producer
2012	Matisyahu	"Sunshine" "Crossroads" featuring J Ralph and Adrien Brody – "Searchin" "Buffalo Soldier" featuring Shyne "Breathe Easily" "I Believe In Love" "Fire Of Freedom" "Desert Eagle" "Bal Chemptov" "King Crown Of Judah" featuring Shyne "Shine On You"	Spark Seeker LP	Producer/Co-writer
2012	Owl City	"Take It All Away"	The Midsummer Station	Co-Writer/Co-Producer
2012	Chelsea Peretti	"Coffee Crankin Thru My Sys"	Single	Producer
2012	Ed Helms	"How Bad Can I Be"	Dr. Seuss' The Lorax: Original Songs from the Motion Picture	Co-Writer/Co-Producer with John Powell
2012	Kesha	"Gold Trans Am"	Warrior (Deluxe version)	Co-Writer/Producer
2012	Kesha	"Wonderland"	Warrior	Co-Writer/Producer
	Jean-Michel Basquiat	"SAMO" (film) featuring Fab Five Freddy, Money Mark, N.A.S.A. & Kool Kojak –		Co-Writer/Co-Producer for MOMA Films
2012	One Direction	"Rock Me"	Take Me Home	Co-Writer/Co-Producer with Peter Svensson and Sam Hollander
2012	Nicki Minaj	"Va Va Voom"	Pink Friday: Roman Reloaded	Co-Writer/Co-Producer with Dr. Luke, Cirkut and Max Martin
2012	Matisyahu	"Happy Hanukkah"	Single	Co-Writer/Producer
2013	Emblem3	"Chloe (You're the One I Want)"	Nothing to Lose	Co-Writer/Co-Producer with Peter Svensson
2013	Kesha: My Crazy Beautiful Life (TV Show)			Music producer
2013	Icona Pop	"On A Roll"	This Is... Icona Pop	Co-producer with Shellback
2013	Scott & Rivers	"はじける"	Scott & Rivers	Co-writer with Rivers Cuomo / Producer
2013	Los Barkers (featuring Lando, Bama and Travis Barker)	"We Like Vegetables"	Songs for a Healthier America	Co-Writer/Producer
2013	Matisyahu, Ariana Grande, Travis Barker, Kool Kojak and Salad Bar	"U R What U Eat"	Songs for a Healthier America	Co-Writer/Producer
	TropKillaz featuring Kool Kojak and Lloyd Pop	"Klap Ur A$$"		Writer/Producer
2013	Kool Kojak	"B-Boyin' Freak Freakin'"	Battle of the Year Official Soundtrack	Writer/Producer
2013	Britney Spears	"Hold on Tight"	Britney Jean (deluxe version)	Co-Producer with A.C.
2014	Brooke Candy	"Bed Squeak"	Opulence EP	Co-Writer with Brooke Candy & Jesse Saint John / Co-Producer with A.C
2014	Aries Onasis	"7even"	album	Composer / Producer
2014	Matt Hunter	"Minha Mina Ta Loca"	Single	Co-Writer with AJ Junior & Bilal Hajji
2014	Yelle	"Florence en Italie"	Complètement Fou	Co-Writer with Yelle Dr. Luke & Cirkut|
2014	Jesse & Joy	"Live Life"	The Book of Life Soundtrack	Co-Writer with Jesse Joy and Nate Campany
2014	Sophia Black	"Vibration"	Single	Co-Writer / Producer with Aaron Joseph and Sophia Black
2014	Chelsea Peretti	"One of the Greats"	Netflix Comedy Special	Composer
2015	The Wedding Ringer	"Party & Bullshit featuring Affion Crockett"	The Wedding Ringer Soundtrack	Producer / Mixer
2015	N.A.S.A.	"Hands Up Don't Shoot!" featuring Sean Paul & Lizzo"	Single	Producer / Mixer
2015	Yelle	"ThE KoOoL kOjAk A.D.D. Ba$$iN MeGaMiX"	French Radio Hot Track Single	Remixer
2015	Waka Flocka Flame featuring Good Charlotte	"Game On"	Pixels Movie	Composer/Producer/Mixer with RAS
2015	TimeFlies	"Burn It Down"	Single	Composer/Producer with TimeFlies
2015	N.A.S.A.	"Iko"	Single	Composer/Synths
2015	N.A.S.A. featuring KRS-One	"Jihad Love Squad"	Single	Composer/Synthesizer Master
2015	N.A.S.A. featuring DMX and Priyanka Chopra	"Meltdown"	Single	Composer/Synthesizer Master/DMX Rap Coach
2015	Sean Paul	"Bust It"	Single / Soundtrack "The Perfect Guy"	Composer / Producer
2016	Diego Boneta	"UR Love"	Single	Composer / Producer
2016	KoOoLkOjAk	"!!!Holla Deck StackEmUp!!!"	Original Film Score "Passengers"	Composer / Producer / Artiste
2017	Allie X	"Casanova"		Composer
2017	Boss Baby TV Program	"Boss Baby I'm The Boss Boss Baby Boss Boss"	TV show Theme Song	Composer / Producer / Rapper
2017	Onyx	"Problem Child"	as featured on Silicon Valley	Composer / Producer
2017	Kim Petras	"Slow It Down"	single	Composer / Producer
2017	Randy Liedtke	"Off & On" Podcast Theme	theme song	Composer / Producer
2018	Randy Liedtke	"Now U R Hi"	Soundtrack single	Composer / Producer
2018	Jahsh Banks	"Nite Life"	single	Composer / Producer
2018	Tropkillaz feat Aloe Blacc	"Milk N Honey"	single	Composer / Producer
2018	Sophia Black featuring Kyle (musician)	"Real Shit"	single	Composer / Producer with Shea Taylor
2018	The Fever	"Hunting Season" featuring Travis Barker	single	Composer
2018	Eric Nam	"FLOAT"	original song for Hotel Transylvania 3	Composer / Producer
2018	Mely Mel feat. Mozart La Para	"No One"	single	Composer / Producer
2018	Teen Titans	"GO! Battle Remix"	single	Composer / Producer
2018	Weezer	"Can't Knock The Hustle"	single	Additional Production / Mariachi stuff
2018	Kool Kojak feat. Destani Wolf	"Can I B Ur Air"	original song for Goosebumps 2	Composer / Producer / Mixer
2018	Spider-Man: Into the Spider-Verse	"Spidey BugOut MegaMix "	MegaMiX for Miles and Uncle Aaron bombin graffiti in tha subway tunnels"	Producer / MegaMixer
2018	Spider-Man: Into the Spider-Verse	"Spidey Bells "	Original Song for Spider-Man: Into the Spider-Verse	Producer
2018	Spider-Man: Into the Spider-Verse	"Joy To The Spidey "	Spider-Man: Into the Spider-Verse Holiday Album	Producer
2019	The Lego Movie 2: The Second Part	"Gotham City Guys "	Original Song for Lego Movie 2	Producer
2019	The Lego Movie 2: The Second Part	"Not Evil"	Original Song for Lego Movie 2	Producer
2019	Doja Cat	"Cyber Sex"	Single	Producer w/ tizhimself
2019	Call Chelsea Peretti	"CESSPOD"	Podcast	Super Producer
2019	Emily Alyn Lind	"Castles"	Single	Producer w/tizhimself
2020	Jahsh Banks	"Drunk Anthem"	Single	Producer w/ tizhimself
2020	Chelsea Peretti	"OatMilk" feat. Reggie Watts	Single	Producer w/ Ruffsound
2020	Chelsea Peretti	"Late"	Single	Composer / Producer / Performer
2020	Chelsea Peretti	"Chore" feat. Chika	Single	Composer / Producer / Performer
2020	Chelsea Peretti	"Soundproof Bathroom"	Single	Composer / Producer / Performer
2020	Chelsea Peretti	"Dad" featuring Will Schwartz	Single	Composer / Producer / Performer
2020	Chelsea Peretti	"BDR" featuring Kathleen Hanna	Single	Composer / Producer with Money Mark
2020	Chelsea Peretti	"Green Tea" featuring Wale	Single	Composer / Producer
2020	Chelsea Peretti	"Expresso" featuring Nick Kroll + Kid Mero	Single	Composer / Producer with Billboard
2020	Allan Kingdom	"Blessed"	Single	Producer with tizhimself
2020	Kim Petras	"Malibu"	Single	co-Composer / co-Producer
2020	Bright & Guilty	"Soft Age featuring Tim Lefev"	KoOoLkOjAK remix	remixer
2020	Zpextre	"Laidback Air"	single	producer with Brian Bender and Zpextre
2020	Zpextre	"Electrify"	single	producer with Zpextre
2020	Zpextre	"Souvenir"	single	producer with Zpextre
2020	Jesse & Joy	"Love (Es Nuestra Idioma) "	Single	Composer with Julie Frost, Jesse y Joy
2020	Jesse & Joy	"Fuego"	Single	Composer with Marty James, Jesse y Joy
2020	Emily Alyn Lind	"Spotless Mind"	Single	Producer
2020	Porsh Bet$	"Apple Eyes"	Single	producer, composer
2020	Porsh Bet$	"Handle"	Single	Producer with SoundBySol
2020	Poolfire	"Radio Man"	Single	arranger with Phil Greiss
2022	Sean Paul featuring Gwen Stefani and Shenseea	"Light My Fire"	Single	Producer Composer with AC

== Art ==
Kool Kojak is also a graffiti artist and sculptor in the US and Brazil. His body of art includes an album cover for Ultramagnetic MCs and New York City murals he painted for 1990's Free Tibet Campaign. In Brazil's early 2000s, Kool Kojak provided hip-hop and graffiti symposiums for the city run youth programs in the Favelas of São Paulo. He has painted murals with Brazilian artists, like Os Gêmeos, Vitche, and Juneca. In 2013, Kool Kojak auctioned off a graffiti sculpture to benefit the Pete Carroll charity A Better L.A. Kool Kojak's artwork adorns the front doors of The Worcester Historical Museum in Worcester, Massachusetts. His work is part of the museum's permanent collection. In 2014, he collaborated with David Choe on a dress. Collectors of KoOoL kOjAk artwork include The Disney Corporation, Sony Pictures, The Worcester Historical Museum, Carly Rae Jepsen, Julia Michaels, Claude Kelly, Martin Johnson, Peter Svensson, and Ammo Pro.

== Filmography ==
Film
Year	Film	Role	Notes
2005	Being Bobby Brown	Score Composer	"The Infamous Chicken Beat" & many others
2009	The Hangover	Composer - End Credits	"Right Round"
2009	The Ugly Truth	Composer	"Right Round"
2009	Couples Retreat	Composer	"Right Round"
2012	The Lorax	Composer / Vocalist	"How Bad Can I Be"
2012	21 Jump Street	Composer / Vocalist	"Boombox"
2012	Pitch Perfect	Composer	"Yo Mama"
2013	Battle Of The Year 3D	Composer	"B Boyin Freak Freakin"
2013	One Direction : This Is Us	Composer	"Rock Me"
2013	Victorious	Composer / Producer / Actor	"The Bad Roommate" "Best Friend's Brother" "L.A. Boys"
2013	Walking With Dinosaurs	Composer	"Live Like A Warrior"
2014	The Book Of Life	Composer/Producer - End Credits	"Live Life"
2015	The Wedding Ringer	Producer and Additional Programmer	"Party & Bullshit"
2015	Pixels	Composer/Producer/Mixer	"Game On"
2015	The Perfect Guy	Composer/Producer/Mixer	"Bust It" Sean Paul
2015	We Are Blood	Soundtrack	"Meltdown" featuring DMX and Priyanka Chopra
2016	Passengers	Original song for film	"!!!Holla Deck StackEmUp!!!"
2017	Boss Baby (TV program)	Theme Song	"Boss Baby I'm The Boss Boss Baby Boss Boss"
2017	Silicon Valley	Composer / Producer with Onyx	"Problem Child"
2018	Randy Wants To Try Marijuana	Funny Or Die Documentary	"Now U R Hi"
2018	Hotel Transylvania 3	Composer / Producer / Engineer / Mixer	"Float"
2018	Teen Titans GO! To The Movies	Composer / Producer	"GO! Battle Remix"
2018	GooseBumps 2	Composer / Producer	"Can I B Ur Air" feat. Destani Wolf
2018	Spider-Man: Into the Spider-Verse	Composer / Producer	"SpideyBellz"
2018	Spider-Man: Into the Spider-Verse	Producer / Megamixer	"Miles and Uncle Aaron Bomb Graffiti"
2019	The Lego Movie 2: The Second Part	Producer	"Gotham City Guys"
2019	The Lego Movie 2: The Second Part	Producer	"Not Evil"
