= L.A. Boyz (song) =

2012 promotional single by the cast of Victorious

Promotional single by Victorious cast featuring Victoria Justice and Ariana Grande

from the EP Victorious 3.0: Even More Music from the Hit TV Show
- Released: October 16, 2012
- Genre: Power pop; bubblegum pop; electro
- Length: 2:59
- Label: Nickelodeon; Columbia
- Songwriters: Kool Kojak; Michael Corcoran; Dan Schneider; Lindy Robbins
- Producer: Kool Kojak

Ariana Grande promotional singles chronology
"L.A. Boyz" (2012)	"Almost Is Never Enough" (2013)

"L.A. Boyz" is a song by the Victorious cast featuring American actresses and singers Victoria Justice and Ariana Grande. The song was released as a promotional single when the show's second and final extended play (EP) Victorious 3.0: Even More Music from the Hit TV Show became available for pre-order on October 16, 2012. It was also featured in a Victorious episode.

"L.A. Boyz" is a power pop, bubblegum pop, and electro song that gives nods to men's masculinity. It was written by Kool Kojak, Michael Corcoran, Dan Schneider, and Lindy Robbins. "L.A. Boyz" received mostly positive reviews from music critics, with some saying it was catchy. The song peaked at number six on the US Billboard Kid Digital Song Sales chart.

== Release history ==
"L.A. Boyz" was first released as a promotional single with the pre-order of Victorious's second and final extended play (EP) Victorious 3.0: Even More Music from the Hit TV Show on October 16, 2012. Two days later, Nickelodeon premiered a music video, which features Victoria Justice and Ariana Grande singing the track. The song then appeared on a Victorious episode titled "Three Girls and a Moose" on October 20, 2012. The episode features Tori Vega (Justice), Cat Valentine (Grande), and Jade West (Elizabeth Gillies) competing for the attention of Beck Oliver's (Avan Jogia) attractive visiting friend from Canada. After arriving late to a show organized by Beck, Andre Harris (Leon Thomas III), and Robbie Shapiro (Matt Bennett), Tori and Cat go on stage and perform "L.A. Boyz." The song was officially released as the second track on Victorious 3.0: Even More Music from the Hit TV Show on November 6, 2012.

== Composition ==
Justice and Grande provide the vocals on the track. The song was written by Kool Kojak, Michael Corcoran, Dan Schneider, and Lindy Robbins. Kool Kojak served as producer and engineer, while Corcoran contributed programming and engineering. The track was mastered by Stephen Marcussen and mixed by Matt Rad. Musically, "L.A. Boyz" is a power pop, bubblegum pop, and electro track. Israel Olorunnisola, writing for MovieWeb, stated that the lyrics for the song are a tribute to men, expressing admiration for their masculinity. Amy Sciarretto of PopCrush commented that "L.A. Boyz" is an "ode to the hotties cruising up and down Sunset Boulevard with the top down in Hollywood".

== Reception ==
"L.A. Boyz" received positive reviews from music critics. Michael Murray, writing for RyanSeacrest.com, described the song as "another catchy tune". Wendy Michaels for Cambio commented that the song is "so catchy", opining that Justice and Grande "sound amazing". Alexandra Daluisio of Teen.com labeled the track as "seriously catchy", mentioning that they "can't seem to get it out of our heads". The joint website of Bop and Tiger Beat commented that it was a "ridiculously catchy song", and stated that they were "totally loving the new music". Writing for The List, Delilah Gray described the track as a "fan favorite" of the show. The staff of ClevverTV described "L.A. Boyz" as one of the extended play's "stand-out tracks".

Kristen S. Hé and Andrew Unterberger for Billboard magazine, put the track at number 127 on their "Every Ariana Grande Song, Ranked: Critic's Picks", calling it a "relentlessly catchy song". They thought while Justice "owns the verses", Grande "nails the soaring high harmonies in the chorus". Justin Curto of Vulture put the song at number 38 on his "All 57 of Ariana Grande's Collaborations, Ranked" list, calling it a "cheesy, innocent song" and opining that "Grande clearly outshines her duet partner on this track". Olorunnisola put the song at number seven on his "Victorious: 10 Songs You Forgot Were Awesome" list, saying that "this summer anthem is one for the boys". Commercially, "L.A. Boyz" peaked at number six on the US Kid Digital Song Sales chart.

== Personnel ==
Credits adapted from Apple Music.

- Victoria Justice – vocals
- Ariana Grande – vocals
- Kool Kojak – writer, producer, engineer
- Michael Corcoran – writer, programming, engineer
- Dan Schneider – writer
- Lindy Robbins – writer
- Stephen Marcussen – mastering engineer
- Matt Rad – mixing engineer

== Charts ==
Chart (2012)	Peak position
US Kid Digital Song Sales (Billboard)	6
