= Victorious 3.0: Even More Music from the Hit TV Show =

EP by Victorious cast featuring Victoria Justice
- Released: November 6, 2012
- Length: 15:44
- Labels: Nickelodeon; Columbia
- Producers: Chris DeStefano; Andrew Goldstein; Sy Rhys Kaye; Emanuel Kiriakou; Kool Kojak; Today Kid

Victorious cast chronology
| Victorious 2.0: More Music from the Hit TV Show (2012) | Victorious 3.0: Even More Music from the Hit TV Show (2012) |

Victoria Justice chronology
| Victorious 2.0: More Music from the Hit TV Show (2012) | Victorious 3.0: Even More Music from the Hit TV Show (2012) | Afterlife of the Party (Music from the Netflix Film) (2021) |

Victorious 3.0: Even More Music from the Hit TV Show is the second and final extended play (EP) for the Nickelodeon television series Victorious. The extended play was released on November 6, 2012, with a total of five tracks by Nickelodeon Records, in association with Columbia. A Walmart Zinepak edition features two bonus tracks.

"L.A. Boyz" was released as a promotional single on October 16, 2012, and peaked at number six on the US Billboard Kid Digital Song Sales chart. Victorious 3.0: Even More Music from the Hit TV Show peaked at number 159 on the US Billboard 200 and charted in the top ten on the US Kid Albums and Soundtrack Albums charts.

== Promotion and release ==
The pre-order for Victorious 3.0: Even More Music from the Hit TV Show became available on October 16, 2012, with the promotional single "L.A. Boyz" released the same day. Two days later, Nickelodeon premiered a music video for "L.A. Boyz", which features Victoria Justice and Ariana Grande singing the track. Commercially, the track peaked at number six on the US Billboard Kid Digital Song Sales chart.

Victorious 3.0: Even More Music from the Hit TV Show was officially released for digital download and streaming on November 6, 2012. The Walmart ZinePak edition of Victorious 3.0: Even More Music from the Hit TV Show was released exclusively in Walmart stores for physical release and included two bonus tracks, a 48-page magazine featuring behind-the-scenes photos from Victorious, interviews from the cast, and recaps of past episodes. In November 2012, a music video for "Here's 2 Us" was released on Nickelodeon and consisted scenes from a Victorious episode.

== Music and lyrics ==
Victorious 3.0: Even More Music from the Hit TV Show opens with "Here's 2 Us" and features Justice on vocals. The song is an upbeat pop track with the lyrics: "Here's to never winning first place/Here's to crying on your birthday/Here's to every single heartbreak." The extended play's next track, "L.A. Boyz" is a power pop, bubblegum pop, and electro track with lyrics about appreciating men's masculinity. The extended play then transitions to "Bad Boys", which features Justice on vocals.

The following track, "You Don't Know Me", is performed by Elizabeth Gillies. Musically, it is described as a pop and rock ballad. The standard edition ends with "Faster Than Boyz" that features vocals from Justice. Lyrically, the song is about a girl who rejects a boy who is interested in her. The Walmart ZinePak edition of Victorious 3.0: Even More Music from the Hit TV Show includes the bonus tracks "Cheer Me Up", featuring vocals from Justice, and "365 Days", that has vocals from Leon Thomas III.

== Reception ==
Crystal Bell for Celebuzz described the songs on the extended play as fan "favorite[s]". Wendy Michaels for Cambio remarked that although Victorious had ended, fans would "at least have the show's soundtrack to listen to". Writing for Teen.com, Alexandra Daluisio commented that "we're basically dying to get our hands on the CD". For Her Campus, Kayla Chanthavisith labeled the extended play as an "absolute masterpiece". The joint website of Bop and Tiger Beat gave Victorious 3.0: Even More Music from the Hit TV Show a positive review, mentioning that they were "jamming" to the extended play's "awesome songs". When describing the extended play, J-14 magazine stated that the extended play allows you to "rock out to all of your favorite songs from the final season of Victorious".

=== Commercial performance ===
Commercially, Victorious 3.0: Even More Music from the Hit TV Show debuted and peaked at number 159 on the US Billboard 200 chart with 3,000 copies sold. It also peaked at number 131 on the US Top Current Album Sales chart, number ten on the US Soundtrack Albums chart, and number six on the US Kid Albums chart.

== Track listing ==
Standard edition
| No. | Title | Writer(s) | Artist(s) | Length |
|---|---|---|---|---|
| 1. | "Here's 2 Us" | Evan Bogart; Lindy Robbins; Emanuel Kiriakou; Michelle Branch | Victorious cast featuring Victoria Justice | 3:21 |
| 2. | "L.A. Boyz" | Robbins; Allan Grigg; Dan Schneider; Michael Corcoran | Victorious cast featuring Victoria Justice and Ariana Grande | 2:59 |
| 3. | "Bad Boys" | Jordan Reynolds; Kara DioGuardi; Chris DeStefano | Victorious cast featuring Victoria Justice | 3:17 |
| 4. | "You Don't Know Me" | Elizabeth Gillies; Jason Levine; Sam Bisbee | Victorious cast featuring Elizabeth Gillies | 2:53 |
| 5. | "Faster Than Boyz" | Grigg; Victoria Justice | Victorious cast featuring Victoria Justice | 3:14 |
| Total length: | | | | 15:44 |

Walmart ZinePak edition bonus tracks
| No. | Title | Writer(s) | Artist(s) | Length |
|---|---|---|---|---|
| 6. | "Cheer Me Up" | Natasha Bedingfield; Toby Gad | Victorious cast featuring Victoria Justice | 3:15 |
| 7. | "365 Days" | Grigg; Leon Thomas III; Robbins | Victorious cast featuring Leon Thomas III | 3:32 |
| Total length: | | | | 22:31 |

== Charts ==
Chart performance for Victorious 3.0: Even More Music from the Hit TV Show
| Chart (2012) | Peak position |
|---|---|
| US Billboard 200 (Billboard) | 159 |
| US Kid Albums (Billboard) | 6 |
| US Soundtrack Albums (Billboard) | 10 |
