= Come with Me =

Come with Me may refer to:

== Film and television ==
- Come with Me (film), an upcoming American drama film
- Come with Me (TV series), a 2016 Hong Kong drama series

== Music ==
=== Albums ===
- Come with Me (EP), by Bobby Valentino, 2008
- Come with Me, by Roger Sanchez, 2006
- Come with Me, by Tania Maria, 1983

=== Songs ===
- "Come with Me" (Dappy song), 2012
- "Come with Me" (Keith Sweat song), 1996
- "Come with Me" (Koda Kumi song), 2003
- "Come with Me" (Phil Collins song), 2003
- "Come with Me" (Puff Daddy song), 1998
- "Come with Me" (Ricky Martin song), 2013
- "Come with Me" (Sammie song), 2007
- "Come with Me" (Waylon Jennings song), 1979
- "Come with Me (Pure Imagination)", by Karmin, 2016
- "Come with Me", by Amerie from Touch, 2005
- "Come with Me", by the Belmonts, 1966
- "Come with Me", by Chalk Circle from The Great Lake, 1986
- "Come with Me", by Denise Lopez from Slave to the Sound, 2003
- "Come with Me", by Donavon Frankenreiter from Pass It Around, 2008
- "Come with Me", by Donna Summer from A Love Trilogy, 1976
- "Come with Me", by Echosmith from Talking Dreams, 2013
- "Come with Me", by Ex Battalion, 2017
- "Come with Me", by Flo Rida from Only One Flo (Part 1), 2010
- "Come with Me", by Graham Nash from Songs for Survivors, 2002
- "Come with Me", by Information Society from Hack, 1990
- "Come with Me", by James Gang from Newborn, 1975
- "Come with Me", by Jamie-Lynn Sigler from Here to Heaven, 2001
- "Come with Me", by Jay Sean from Me Against Myself, 2004
- "Come with Me", by John Mayall from Bottom Line, 1979
- "Come with Me", by Kathryn Williams and Neill MacColl from Two, 2008
- "Come with Me", by Nora En Pure, 2013
- "Come with Me", by Rare Earth from Ma, 1973
- "Come with Me", by Riton, 2021
- "Come with Me", by Special D. from Reckless, 2004
- "Come with Me", by Stevie B from In My Eyes, 1989
- "Chal Chal Mere Sang Sang" (lit. 'Come with Me') by Sukhwinder Singh from the 2000 Indian film Astitva
- "Come with Me", by Zwan from Mary Star of the Sea, 2003
- "Come with Me", written by Richard Rodgers and Lorenz Hart for the musical The Boys from Syracuse, 1938
- "Come with Me (Deadmeat)", by Steve Aoki from Wonderland, 2012
- "Come with Me (Rabbittland)", by Eddie Rabbitt from Songs from Rabbittland, 1997

== See also ==
- Come Along with Me (disambiguation)
- Come Go with Me (disambiguation)
