= Come Go with Me (disambiguation) =

"Come Go with Me" is a 1957 song by the Del-Vikings, also covered by Dion, the Beach Boys, and others.

Come Go with Me may also refer to:

- Come Go with Me (album), a 1966 album by Gloria Jones
- "Come Go with Me" (Pockets song), 1977
- "Come Go with Me" (Exposé song), 1987
- "If You're Ready (Come Go with Me)", a 1973 song by the Staple Singers
- "Come Go with Me", a song by Teddy Pendergrass from Teddy

== See also ==
- Come with Me (disambiguation)
- Come Along with Me (disambiguation)
