= Talking to the Man in the Moon =

Single by Titiyo

from the album Titiyo
- A-side: "Talking to the Man in the Moon"
- B-side: "Jammin' with the Man in the Moon"
- Released: 1989
- Genre: Rhythm and blues
- Label: Telegram/Warner
- Songwriter(s): Magnus Frykberg

Titiyo singles chronology
"My Body Says Yes"	"Talking to the Man in the Moon" (1989)	"After the Rain" (1989)

"Talking to the Man in the Moon" is a 1989 hit by songwriter Magnus Frykberg and the first charting single by Swedish singer Titiyo from the eponymous debut music album Titiyo. The critically acclaimed single was a "massive late 1980s European hit"; it charted in Sweden for five weeks, and reached no. 6.
