= Paus (band) =

Swedish band

- Origin: Sweden
- Genres: Rock, pop
- Years active: 1998, 2001
- Label: RCA Victor
- Past members: Joakim Berg; Peter Svensson; Dennis Johansson; Bengt Lagerberg
- Website: www.paus.nu (defunct)

Paus was a Swedish band consisting of Joakim Berg of Kent and Peter Svensson of The Cardigans.

They released their first and only album, entitled Paus, in 1998. Two singles, Leia and Chock, were released during 1998. Peter Svensson sang all of the band's songs, except for their cover of Eldkvarn's Kärlekens tunga, for which Joakim Berg provided vocals. The song featured on the tribute album Plura 50, en hyllningsplatta, released in 2001.

Svensson wrote most of the band's music, while Berg contributed with lyrics.

== Discography ==
=== Albums ===
- Paus (1998)

=== Singles ===
- Leia (1998)
- Chock (1998)
