= Hidden (Titiyo album) =

Studio album by Titiyo
- Released: October 29, 2008
- Genre: Pop; electro pop; acoustic pop
- Label: Sheriff

Titiyo chronology
Come Along (2001)	Hidden (2008)	13 Gården (2015)

Hidden is the fifth studio album by Swedish recording artist Titiyo. It was released on October 29, 2008, on Sheriff Records and Warner Music Sweden.

== Track listing ==
No.	Title	Length
1.	"Awakening"	4:29
2.	"Standby Beauty"	4:31
3.	"If Only Your Bed Could Cry" (featuring Moto Boy)	3:41
4.	"Crystal Clear Mud"	5:54
5.	"Stumble to Fall"	3:05
6.	"Longing for Lullabies"	4:27
7.	"Drunken Gnome" (featuring Goran Kajfeš)	7:40
8.	"N. Y."	4:49
9.	"X"	2:36

== Charts ==
=== Weekly charts ===
Chart (2008)	Peak position
Swedish Albums (Sverigetopplistan)	18
