= Peter Svensson =

Swedish musician

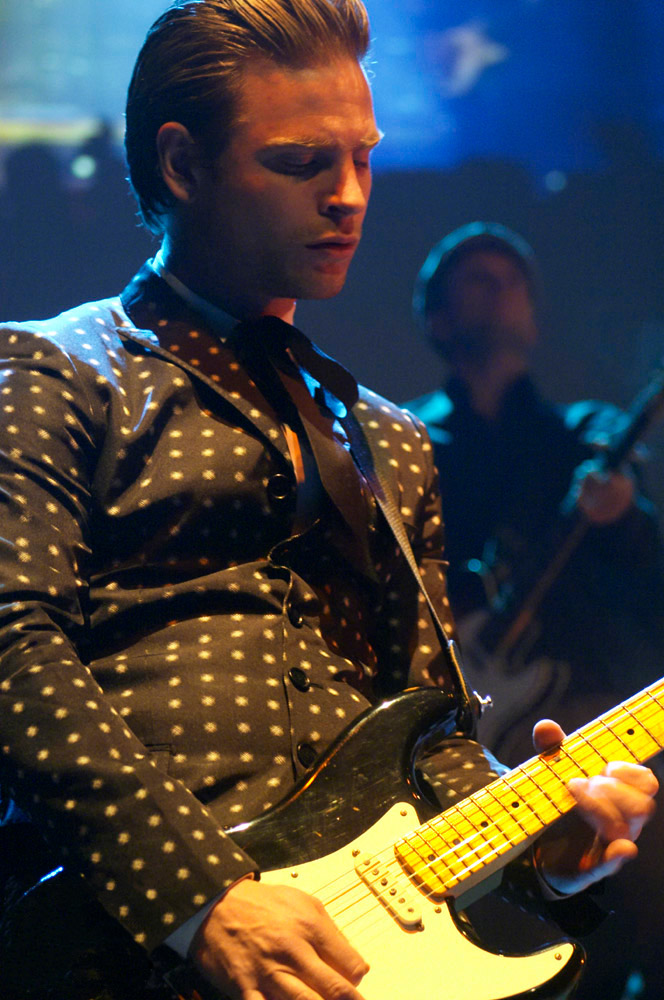
- Svensson with the Cardigans in 2006

Background information
- Born: Anders Peter Svensson; 18 October 1974 (age 51)
- Origin: Huskvarna, Sweden
- Genres: Pop; pop rock
- Occupations: Record producer; songwriter; musician; guitarist
- Years active: 1992–present
- Member of: The Cardigans
- Formerly of: Paus

Anders Peter Svensson (born October 18, 1974) is a Swedish record producer, songwriter, and musician. He is the former main songwriter and guitarist of the band the Cardigans. Svensson started playing guitar at the age of eight, and in his teens he went on to play with local bands. After meeting bass player Magnus Sveningsson, they formed The Cardigans in 1992. Svensson is credited with writing the music and melodies for almost all of the group's original songs.

In 1998, he released a side/solo project called Paus. All songs were co-written together with Joakim Berg from the band Kent. The drums were played by The Cardigans' drummer Bengt Lagerberg. In 1999, Paus's self-titled debut album and Svensson's work on The Cardigans' fourth album, Gran Turismo, earned him a Swedish Grammy as Composer of the Year.

Svensson and Berg co-wrote Swedish singer Titiyo’s album, Come Along, with the single "Come Along" becoming a hit and later awarded a Swedish Grammy for Song of the Year.

Since the last album with The Cardigans, Super Extra Gravity, Svensson has written and produced songs for numerous international artists, including The Weeknd, Ariana Grande, Ellie Goulding and One Direction.

== Production and songwriting discography ==
Title	Year	Album	Songwriter	Producer
"2 Be Loved (Am I Ready)"	2022	Lizzo – Special	check	
"I'm Ready"	2020	Sam Smith & Demi Lovato – Love Goes and Dancing with the Devil... the Art of Starting Over (Expanded Edition)	check	
"Bad Idea"	2019	Ariana Grande – Thank U, Next	check	
"Close To Me" (ft. Swae Lee)	2018	Ellie Goulding & Diplo – Brightest Blue	check	
"Breathin"	2018	Ariana Grande – Sweetener	check	
"Bloom"	2018	Troye Sivan - Bloom	check	
"No More"	2017	PRETTYMUCH – TBA	check	check
"Would You Mind"	2017	PRETTYMUCH – TBA	check	
"Calm Down"	2017	Skip Marley – TBA	check	check
"Rockin"	2016	The Weeknd – Starboy	check	
"Love to Lay"	2016	The Weeknd – Starboy	check	
"A Lonely Night"	2016	The Weeknd – Starboy	check	
"Ordinary Life"	2016	The Weeknd – Starboy	check	
"What U Workin' With?"	2016	Justin Timberlake – Trolls: Original Motion Picture Soundtrack	check	
"Saw It Coming"	2016	G-Eazy feat. Jeremih – Ghostbusters	check	check
"Thinking Bout You"	2016	Ariana Grande – Dangerous Woman	check	check
"Touch It"	2016	Ariana Grande – Dangerous Woman	check	
"Sometimes"	2016	Ariana Grande – Dangerous Woman	check	
"Me Too"	2016	Meghan Trainor – Thank You	check	
"Don't Need Nobody"	2015	Ellie Goulding – Delirium	check	check
"Focus"	2015	Ariana Grande – Dangerous Woman (Japan Exclusive Version)	check	
"Can't Feel My Face"	2015	The Weeknd – Beauty Behind the Madness	check	
"In The Night"	2015	The Weeknd – Beauty Behind the Madness	check	
"Shameless"	2015	The Weeknd – Beauty Behind the Madness	check	check
"I Really Like You"	2015	Carly Rae Jepsen - Emotion	check	check
"Mama"	2015	Lunchmoney Lewis – Bills EP	check	
"Good Thing"	2015	Sage The Gemini feat. Nick Jonas	check	
"Love Me Harder" (Ariana Grande & The Weeknd)	2014	Ariana Grande – My Everything	check	check
"Rock n Roll"	2013	Avril Lavigne – Avril Lavigne	check	check
"On A Roll"	2013	Icona Pop – This Is...	check	
"Tumbling Down"	2013	Tessanne Chin – Count On My Love	check	
"Chloe (You're the One I Want)"	2013	Emblem3 – Nothing To Lose	check	check
"Rock Me"	2012	One Direction – Take Me Home	check	
"Glassheart"	2012	Leona Lewis – Glassheart	check	
"Come Along" (featuring CeeLo Green)	2012	Vicci Martinez – Vicci	check	check
"Run Run Run"	2012	Vicci Martinez – Vicci	check	check
"Out Of Control"	2012	Vicci Martinez – Vicci	check	check
"Alive"	2012	Vicci Martinez – Vicci	check	check
"Little Faith"	2012	Vicci Martinez – Vicci	check	check
"Can’t Get Enough"	2010	Eagle-Eye Cherry – Can’t Get Enough	check	check
"Your Hero"	2010	Eagle-Eye Cherry – Can’t Get Enough	check	check
"One In A Million"	2010	Eagle-Eye Cherry – Can’t Get Enough	check	check
"Love Me"	2009	Justin Bieber – My World	check	
"Something To Die For"	2008	Carolina Liar – Coming To Terms	check	
"When You Are Near"	2008	Carolina Liar – Coming To Terms	check	
"Last Years Song"	2006	Lisa Miskovsky – Changes	check	
"Little By Little"	2005	Marion Raven – Here I Am	check	
"Come Along"	2001	Titiyo – Come Along	check	check
"1989"	2001	Titiyo – Come Along	check	check
"Love Has Left Your Eye"	2001	Titiyo – Come Along	check	check
"My Heart Won"	2001	Titiyo – Come Along	check	check
"Show"	2001	Titiyo – Come Along	check	check
"Hold Her Tight"	2001	Titiyo – Come Along	check	check
"Right Or Wrong"	2001	Titiyo – Come Along	check	check
"I See Good In People"	2001	Titiyo – Come Along	check	check
"Where Do We Go?(Last Time)"	2001	Titiyo – Come Along	check	check
"Given Thing"	2001	Titiyo – Come Along	check	check
"Time"	2001	Titiyo – Come Along	check	check
"Kärlekens Tunga"	2001	Paus – "Plura 50, en hyllningsplatta"		check
