= Titiyo =

Swedish singer and songwriter (born 1967)

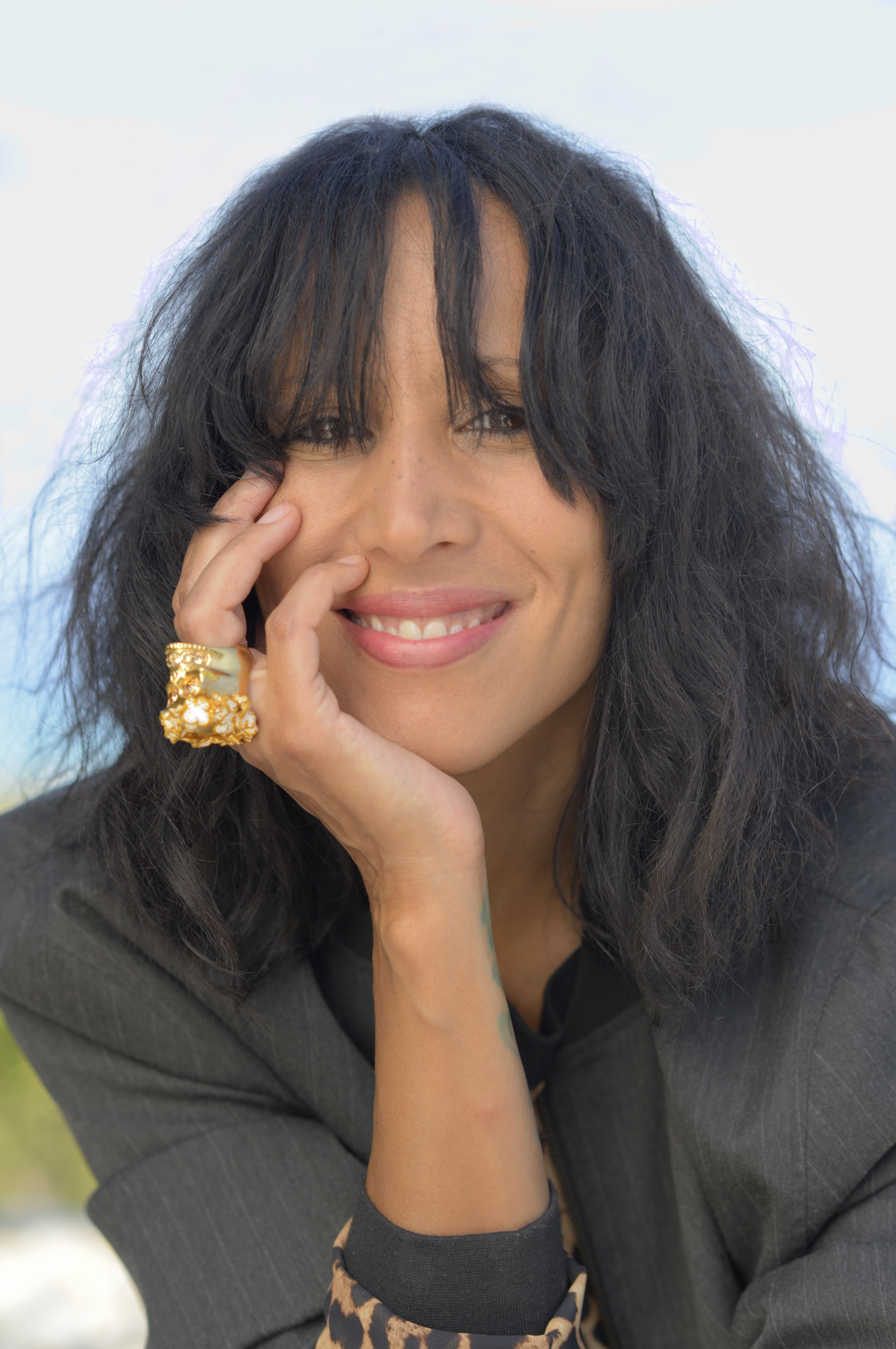
- Titiyo in October 2013

Background information
- Born: Titiyo Yambalu Felicia Jah; 23 July 1967 (age 58); Stockholm, Sweden
- Genres: Pop; soul; R&B
- Occupations: Singer; songwriter
- Years active: 1989–present
- Label: Warner Music
- Website: www.titiyo.com

Titiyo Yambalu Felicia Jah (born 23 July 1967) is a Swedish singer and songwriter who has won four Grammis awards.

== Biography ==
=== Early life ===
Titiyo was born in Stockholm, Sweden, to Ahmadu Jah, a Sierra Leonean drummer, and Maylen Bergström. Through Jah, she is the younger sister of record producer Cherno Jah and half-sister of singer-songwriter Neneh Cherry. She grew up in Solna.

=== Musical career ===
Titiyo discovered her own singing abilities when invited by her older sister to sing with her at a studio in London. She fronted her own band in 1987 and played the Stockholm circuit, and signed with a local label, Telegram, in 1989. She also sang background vocals for a range of Swedish artists, including Army of Lovers and Jakob Hellman. In 1989, Titiyo released her self-titled debut album, which topped at No. 3 in Sweden, and was released in the United States on Arista, and became one of the contributions to a Swedish R&B wave in the US that lasted throughout the nineties. The single "My Body Says Yes" was a hit in North America, and "Talking to the Man in the Moon" reached No. 6 in the Swedish charts; the subsequent single, "After the Rain," reached No. 13.

Titiyo took a two-year break and returned in 1993 with the Aretha Franklin cover "Never Let Me Go" (a hit that reached number 25 on Swedish chart), later included on her second full-length This is Titiyo. Remixes of this and some of her other songs were popular in the London club scene. Her third album, Extended, produced by Kent (Gillström) Isaacs (released by the Swedish label Diesel Music), appeared in 1997, producing the hit single "Josefin Dean" (named after Mariah Carey's best friend).

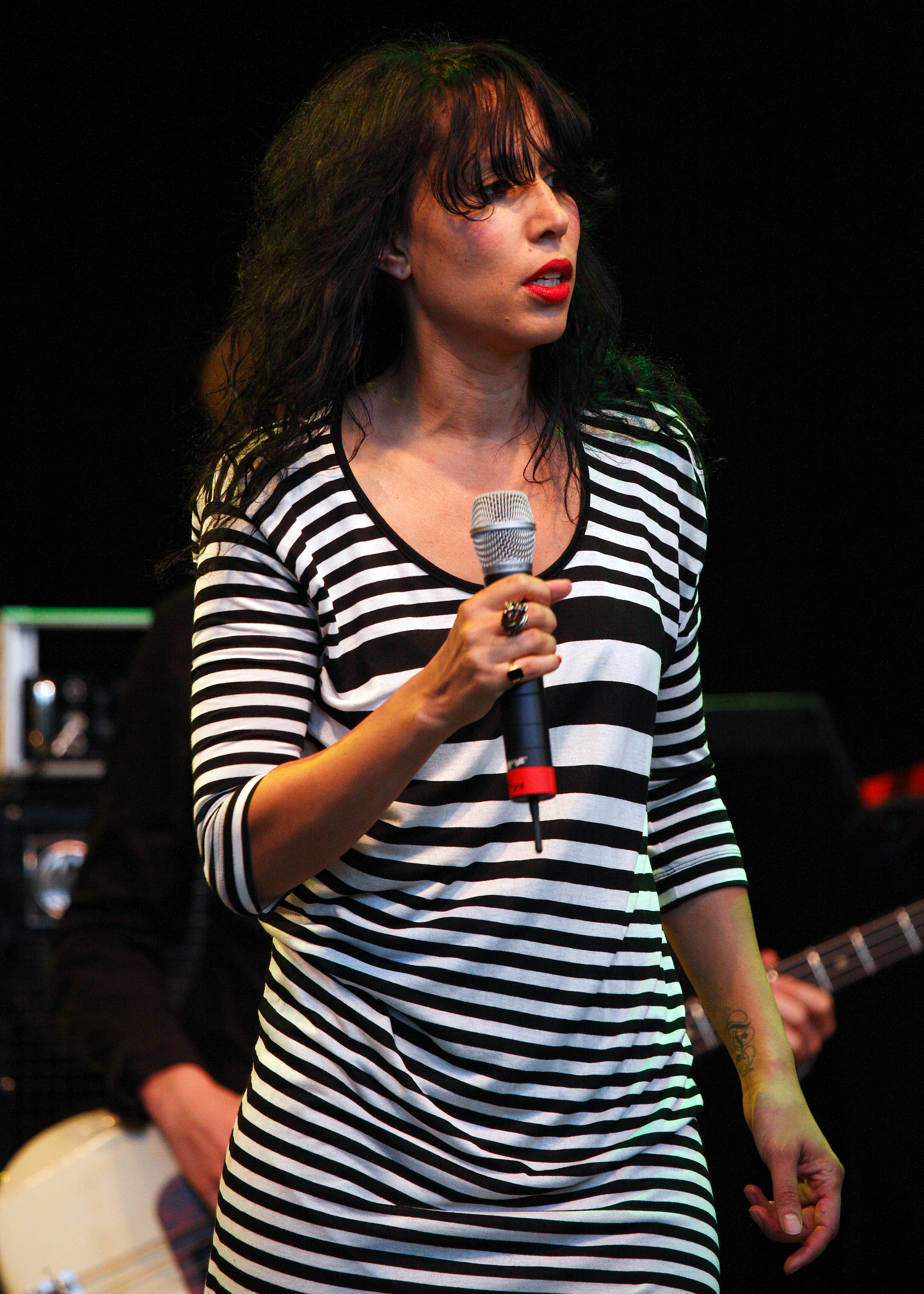
Titiyo in Skellefteå 2008.

In 2001, Titiyo revitalised her career with her successful fourth studio album Come Along (released in the US in 2002; also on Diesel Music), spawning the eponymous single "Come Along", which became an international hit. Produced by Peter Svensson (The Cardigans) and Joakim Berg (Kent), the album and its title song made it to the top of in the Swedish charts, while the single was a success in several European countries including France, (Germany), Switzerland, and the Netherlands. The second single from the album, "1989", was not nearly as successful as its predecessor but reached the top-30 of the French singles chart.

After a lengthy hiatus, Warner Music released a greatest hits album named Best of Titiyo in 2004, which included two new songs. One of these songs, "Loving out of Nothing", charted within the top-20 in Sweden in early 2005.

In spring 2008, Titiyo was asked to contribute vocals to Kleerup's single "Longing for Lullabies". Released in April 2008 in Scandinavia, the single has since reached the top 20 in Denmark and top 10 in Sweden.

Titiyo released her fifth album, Hidden, on the Swedish independent label Sheriff late 2008. The album mainly feature self-penned material but also results of collaborations with the likes of Kleerup, Moto Boy, and Goran Kajfes of Oddjob. So far videos for "Stumble to Fall" and "Awakening" have been released.

In 2015, she released her sixth studio album, 13 Gården, which was nominated for a Swedish Grammy in the category "Best Pop". Named after her childhood address in the Solna Municipality, outside of Stockholm, it was Titiyo's first album to be recorded entirely in the Swedish language.

== Personal life ==
Titiyo's daughter Femi was born in 1992. Femi's father is music producer Magnus Frykberg.

== Discography ==
=== Studio albums ===
Year	Album	Peak position	Certification
Year	Album	SWE	Certification
1990	Titiyo	3	
1993	This Is Titiyo	1	
1997	Extended	27	
2001	Come Along	1	
2008	Hidden	18	
2015	13 Gården	5	
2025	Hemland	7	

=== Compilations ===
Year	Album	Peak positions	Certification
Year	Album	SWE	Certification
2004	A Collection of Songs	32	
2013	Collection	54	

=== Selected singles ===
Year	Single	Chart positions										Album
Year	Single	SWE	BEL (FL)	BEL (WA)	DEN	FRA	GER	NL	SWI	UK	US	Album
1989	"Man in the Moon"	6	—	—	—	—	—	—	—	—	—	Titiyo
1989	"After the Rain"	13	—	—	—	—	—	—	—	60	—	Titiyo
1990	"Flowers"	—	—	—	—	—	—	—	—	71	—	Titiyo
1991	"My Body Says Yes"	—	—	—	—	—	—	—	—	111	42	Titiyo
1993	"Never Let Me Go"	25	—	—	—	—	—	—	—	—	—	This Is
1994	"Tell Me (I'm Not Dreaming)"	—	—	—	—	—	—	—	—	45	—	This Is
1995	"It Should Have Been You" (Blacknuss feat. Jennifer Brown & Titiyo)	—	—	—	—	—	80	—	—	83	—	Blacknuss Allstars (Blacknuss album)
1996	"We Vie" (Titiyo & Stakka Bo with Fleshquartet and Nåid)	10	—	—	—	—	—	—	—	—	—	jr. (Stakka Bo album)
2001	"Come Along"	3	17	35	7	13	11	20	22	—	—	Come Along
2001	"1989"	—	56	43	—	23	—	88	83	—	—	Come Along
2004	"Lovin' Out of Nothing"	17	—	—	—	—	—	—	—	—	—	Best of - A Collection of Songs
2005	"Feels Like Heaven"	—	—	—	—	—	—	—	—	—	—	Best of - A Collection of Songs
2007	"Du" (with Staffan Hellstrand)	7	71	—	14	—	—	—	—	—	—	non-album release
2008	"Longing for Lullabies" (with Kleerup)	7	71	—	14	—	—	—	—	—	—	Kleerup (Kleerup album)
2008	"300 Slow Days in a Row" (with Marit Bergman)	—	—	—	—	—	—	—	—	—	—	The Tear Collector (Marit Bergman album)
2008	"Longing for Lullabies" (solo version)	42	—	—	—	—	—	—	—	—	—	Hidden
2008	"Stumble to Fall"	—	—	—	—	—	—	—	—	—	—	Hidden
2009	"Awakening"	52	—	—	—	—	—	—	—	—	—	Hidden
2010	"If Only Your Bed Could Cry" (with Moto Boy)	—	—	—	—	—	—	—	—	—	—	Hidden
2010	"Side by Side" (with Theodor Jensen)	—	—	—	—	—	—	—	—	—	—	Tough Love (Theodor Jensen album)
2013	"Själen av en vän"	20	—	—	—	—	—	—	—	—	—	
2014	"Drottningen är tillbaka"	—	—	—	—	—	—	—	—	—	—	13 Gården
2014	"Solna"	—	—	—	—	—	—	—	—	—	—	13 Gården
2015	"Taxi"	—	—	—	—	—	—	—	—	—	—	13 Gården
2017	"Talking to the Man in the Moon"	—	—	—	—	—	—	—	—	—	—	Non-album single
2019	"Soptippsvärld"	63	—	—	—	—	—	—	—	—	—	Så mycket bättre
2019	"Evighet"	100	—	—	—	—	—	—	—	—	—	

== Awards ==
Grammis

As of 2011, Titiyo has won four Grammis:

Year	Nominee / work	Award	Result
1990	Herself	Newcomer of the Year	Won
1991	Herself	Best Female Pop/Rock Artist	Won
1991	"Flowers"	Best Music Video	Nominated
1994	Herself	Best Female Pop/Rock Artist	Nominated
1998	Herself	Best Female Pop/Rock Artist	Won
2002	Herself	Best Female Pop/Rock Artist	Nominated
2002	Come Along	Best Album	Nominated
2002	"Come Along"	Best Song	Won
2005	A Collection of Songs	Best Compilation	Nominated
2009	"Longing for Lullabies"	Best Song	Nominated
2016	Herself	Best Pop Artist	Nominated

Hit Awards

- 2001: Best Hit for "Come Along" (nominated)

MTV Europe Music Awards

- 2001: Best Nordic Act (nominated)

P3 Guld Music Awards

- 2009: Best Song for "Longing for Lullabies" (nominated)
