= Chloe (You're the One I Want) =

Single by Emblem3

from the album Nothing to Lose
- Released: April 15, 2013
- Recorded: 2013
- Genre: Reggae fusion, alternative hip hop, pop rock, teen pop
- Length: 3:42
- Label: Columbia, Syco
- Songwriters: Drew Chadwick, Kool Kojak, Peter Svensson, Wesley Stromberg, Keaton Stromberg, Savan Kotecha
- Producers: Kool Kojak, Peter Svensson

Emblem3 singles chronology
"Chloe (You're the One I Want)" (2013)	"3000 Miles" (2013)

"Chloe (You're the One I Want)" is the debut single of American pop rock trio Emblem3 from their debut studio album, Nothing to Lose, which was released July 30, 2013. It was their first single after placing fourth on the second season of The X Factor and after signing on Simon Cowell's Syco. It was released digitally on April 15, 2013, through Syco and Columbia Records.

== Background ==
After placing fourth on the second season of The X Factor, their mentor Simon Cowell signed the Emblem3 to his music label Syco Music, to be distributed in the United States through Columbia Records.

Speculation has surrounded the song, with claims that the song was written about Khloé Kardashian, who was a host on The X-Factor during the band's time on the show. The lyrics state "Chloe, I know your sister turns everyone on" which some believe refers to Kim. The band has rejected these claims saying the line is an attention-getter and "everyone thinks it's about Khloé Kardashian but it's not". The band clarified that the song is about girls and insecurities in general, however they have admitted that they grew close to Khloé and attended the Kardashians' Christmas party the night before their recording session. Later, the band admitted that the song was inspired by the Kardashian sisters, but maintained that the song is not literally about the Kardashians.

The song received greater attention when 5 Seconds of Summer and several Vine stars such as Hayes Grier posted themselves dancing to the song on social media.

== Music video ==
On May 8, 2013, the official lyric video was uploaded on the group's Vevo channel. A series of video countdown teasers and trailers preceded the video premiere.

The song's official music video premiered on the group's VEVO channel on May 27, 2013. The video was directed by Ray Kay.

The video starts with Keaton playing Drew's guitar with the boys backstage. Then there are various scenes with a clique of popular girls, gossiping and mocking the less popular girls. Many of the other girls feel insecure, but their moods improve when they receive a white pin with red lettering that says "I'm a Chloe @EmblemThree".

This signifies that they are the kind of girls Emblem3 likes, and that they have been invited to a special Emblem3 concert. The pins are passed girl by girl and towards the end there are hundreds of fans holding up their Chloe pins at a concert in order to gain entry.

Meanwhile, the group of "popular girls" who did not receive pins are not let in, so they stomp off, while the girls with pins are permitted to enter the concert where Emblem3 performs on stage, singing and dancing during a performance of Chloe. The video ends with Emblem3 allowing their fans on stage to dance with them.

== Chart performance ==
The song sold over 35,000 digital downloads in its first two weeks in the United States and has sold over 330,000 downloads as of October 20, 2013. It made them the second X Factor USA act to have a single enter the Billboard Hot 100.

=== Charts ===
Chart (2013)	Peak position
Canada Hot 100 (Billboard)	87
South Korea (Gaon Chart)	93
US Billboard Hot 100	93
US Pop Airplay (Billboard)	25

== Live performances ==
The trio performed Chloe for their summer tour. On June 7, 2013, along with Little Mix, Emblem3 performed their single on ABC's Good Morning America. On July 29, 2013, the group made a guest appearance to perform the song on ABC's The View.

== Release history ==
Country	Date	Format	Label
United States	April 15, 2013	Digital download	Columbia Records
United States	May 7, 2013	Mainstream airplay	Columbia Records
