= 13 Gården =

Studio album by Titiyo
- Released: 16 October 2015
- Genre: Pop; synth pop; R&B
- Label: Telegram

Titiyo chronology
Hidden (2008)	13 Gården (2015)

13 Gården is the sixth studio album by Swedish recording artist Titiyo. It was released on 16 October 2015 on Telegram Records and Warner Music Sweden, marking her first full-length album in seven years. Named after her childhood address in the Solna Municipality, outside of Stockholm, it was Titiyo's first album to be recorded entirely in Swedish.

== Track listing ==
No.	Title	Writer(s)	Length
1.	"Första låten"	Titiyo; Dante Kinnunen; Martin Sakarias	3:15
2.	"Taxi"	David Lindvall; Jonathan Johansson	3:29
3.	"Solna"	Johansson; Kinnunen; Sakarias; Martin Renck	4:47
4.	"Fram till kanten"	Lindvall; Johansson	4:20
5.	"Självantänder"	Titiyo; Adiam Feireiss; Andreas Pfannenstill; Dante Kinnunen; Ludwig Bell	3:06
6.	"Företagsgig"	Kinnunen; Johansson	2:33
7.	"Hålla dig vaken"	Lindvall; Johansson	3:39
8.	"13%"	Kinnunen; Johansson	2:38
9.	"Du tar hand om honom"	Titiyo; Kinnunen; Linnea Henriksson; Oskar Humlebo	4:48
10.	"Drottningen är tillbaka"	Titiyo; Kinnunen; Felix Flygare Floderer; Sakarias	3:46
11.	"Jag lovar"	Kinnunen; Johansson; Sakarias	5:07
12.	"Nån måste gå för långt"	Titiyo	0:57

== Charts ==
Chart (2015)	Peak position
Swedish Albums (Sverigetopplistan)	5
