= Nasty as I Wanna Be =

Studio album by Dirt Nasty
- Released: August 10, 2010
- Genre: Hip hop
- Length: 56:52
- Label: Shoot to Kill; MySpace; RED; RBC; E1 (Physical release)
- Producer: Kool Kojak; Cisco Adler; Christian George; Jeramy Gritter; Jimmy Juarez; Justin Franks; David Listenbee; The Alchemist

Dirt Nasty chronology
Dirt Nasty (2007)	Nasty as I Wanna Be (2010)

Nasty as I Wanna Be is the second album by American rapper, Simon Rex, also known as Dirt Nasty. It was released by Shoot to Kill Music in association with Myspace Records. The title track was released on July 6, 2010 as a teaser for the album. The album title itself is based on the 2 Live Crew album, As Nasty As They Wanna Be.

== Background ==
After success with his self-titled debut album, Dirt Nasty soon began work on a second album. American pop-star Kesha and producer Kool Kojak both contributed significantly towards the album, with Kesha appearing on two songs and co-writing three tracks, and Kool Kojak producing seven tracks off the album. LMFAO, Bonnie McKee, Christian George and various other performers appeared on the album.

== Track listing ==
Liner notes are adapted from Discogs.

No.	Title	Writer(s)	Producer(s)	Length
1.	"As Nasty as I Wanna Be"	Simon Rex; Allan Grigg; Alan Maman; Anthony Ray	The Alchemist	4:21
2.	"Boombox" (featuring Kesha (Note: Kesha provides uncredited vocals on "Boombox".) and Wiskaz)	Rex; Kesha Sebert; Grigg	Kool Kojak	3:19
3.	"Milk, Milk, Lemonade" (featuring Too Short and Warren G)	Rex; Todd Shaw; Warren Griffin; Grigg	Kool Kojak	3:28
4.	"Motel Room (Note: Katie Coco provides uncredited vocals on "Motel Room".)"	Rex; Jimmy Juarez	Jimmy Juarez	3:49
5.	"Big in Japan (Note: "Big in Japan" features a prominent sample from the Alphaville song of the same name.)"	Rex; Cisco Adler	Cisco Adler	3:32
6.	"So L.A (Note: Katie Coco provides uncredited vocals on "So L.A.".)"	Rex; Adler	Cisco Adler	3:39
7.	"Turn It Up (Note: Jade Fonda provides uncredited vocals on "Turn It Up".)" (featuring Beardo)	Rex; Jeramy Gritter	Jeramy Gritter	3:00
8.	"Lookin' for a Nasty Girl (Note: KT Davis provides uncredited vocals on "Lookin' for a Nasty Girl".)"	Rex; Adler	Cisco Adler	3:15
9.	"Fuck Me I'm Famous"	Rex; Justin Scott Franks	Justin Franks	5:12
10.	"Miami Nights" (featuring Kesha and Benji Hughes)	Rex; K. Sebert; Grigg; Benji Hughes	Kool Kojak	4:35
11.	"I Can't Dance" (featuring LMFAO)	Rex; Stefan Gordy; Skyler Gordy; David Listenbee	David Listenbee	4:55
12.	"Cougars (Note: MC PCP provides uncredited vocals on "Cougars".)" (featuring Bonnie McKee)	Rex; K. Sebert; Bonnie McKee; Grigg	Kool Kojak	4:38
13.	"Suck My Dick"	Rex; Grigg	Kool Kojak	3:20
14.	"Canal Street" (featuring Christian George)	Rex; Christian George; Alexander Jones; Michael Sherman	Christian George	4:58
15.	"Gibberish" (featuring Andy Milonakis and Andre Legacy)	Rex; Andrew Milonakis; Andre Legacy; Grigg	Kool Kojak	3:31
Total length:				56:52
