= Denise Lopez (Swedish singer) =

Mexican-born Swedish singer and DJ (born 1972)

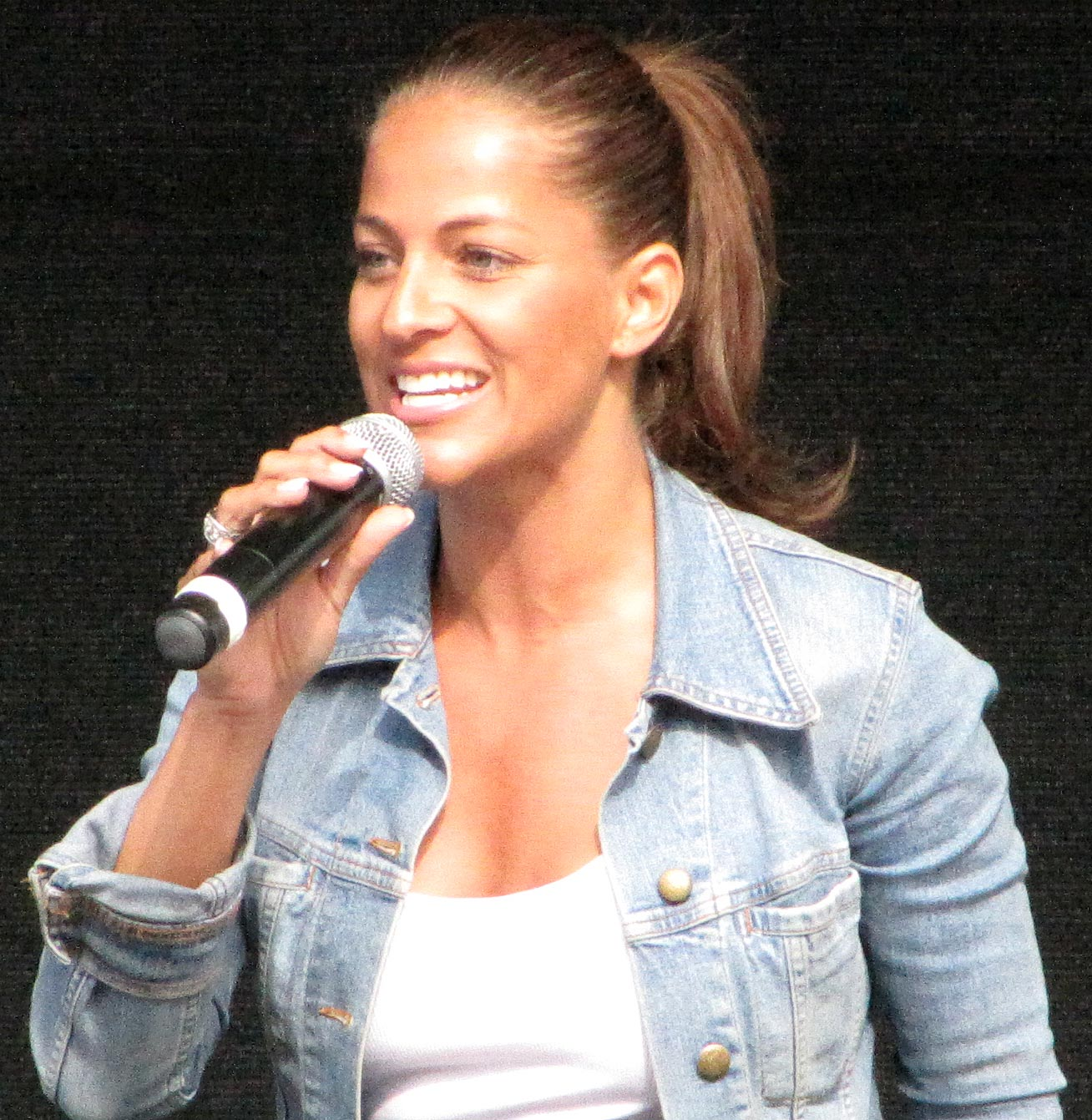
- Born: Denise Christana Lopez; 31 May 1972 (age 54); Mexico City, Mexico
- Other name: DeDe
- Occupations: Actress, singer, rapper, dancer
- Years active: 1993-present
- Website: deniselopez.com dedelopez.com

Denise "DeDe" Lopez is a Mexican-born Swedish singer, rapper, and DJ.

Lopez scored two top 40 hits in Sweden: "Last to Know" (#28 in 2003) and "Girls & Rock 'n Roll", with Lazee (#27 in 2010).

== Discography ==
Albums

- TBA (Totally Bombastic Anecdotes) (1995)
- I Do (1997)
- Metaphor (1999)
- Like a Queen (Japan) (2002)
- Slave to the Sound (2003)
- Gemini 1994–2004 (2004)
- Black Lace & Leather (2011)
- Revolution (2021)
- Hide & Seek (2022) New release of Black Lace & Leather

Singles

- "My Crush" (1993)
- "Silly Games" (1993)
- "Take A Step Back" (1995)
- "Party" (1995)
- "In The Mood" (1996)
- "(Can We) Swing It" (1996)
- "My Lover" (1997)
- "Get to You" (1997)
- "Gimme All You Got" (1997)
- "Everybody" (1999)
- "Let Me Show You How" (1999)
- "Lita På Mig" feat Blues (2001)
- "Someone Somewhere Someday" (2003)
- "Love Me Down" (2003)
- "Last To Know" feat Laila Adele (2003)
- "Tarzan Boy" (2005)
- "B.I.T.C.H (Being In Total Control Of Herself)" (2007)
- "Turn You On" feat Pras Michel (2007)
- "Girls & Rock 'N' Roll" feat Lazee (2010)
- "Your World Is Mine" (2012)
- "Dare To Change The World" feat MC Lyte (2018)
