= Come Along with Me =

Come Along with Me may refer to:

- "Come Along with Me" (Adventure Time), the series finale to the animated show Adventure Time
  - "Island Song" (also known as "Come Along With Me"), the series's ending theme; a song by Lake containing the titular lyrics
- Come Along with Me (collection), collection of works by Shirley Jackson
  - Come Along with Me (novel), titular novel

== Songs ==
- "Come Along with Me", by Cole Porter from the musical Can-Can, 1953
- "Come Along With Me", by Jan Errico, 1963
- "Come Along with Me", by Jules Bass and Maury Laws from the TV special Hans Christian Andersen's The Emperor's New Clothes, 1972
- "Come Along with Me", by Bitter:Sweet from the album Drama, 2008

== See also ==
- Come Along (disambiguation)
- Come with Me (disambiguation)
- Come Go with Me (disambiguation)
