= Come Along (Titiyo song) =

2001 single by Titiyo

Single by Titiyo

from the album Come Along
- Released: 2001
- Genre: Blues
- Length: 3:42
- Label: Superstudio Blå; Teleg; WEA
- Songwriters: Joakim Berg; Peter Svensson
- Producer: Tore Johansson

Titiyo singles chronology
"We Vie" (1996)	"Come Along" (2001)	"1989" (2001)

"Come Along" is a song by Swedish recording artist Titiyo. It was written by Joakim Berg and Peter Svensson for her album of the same name (2001), while production was helmed by Tore Johansson. The song was selected as the album's lead single and reached the first place in GLF and, according to Billboard, became the most played song on Sveriges Radio. The song was awarded a Swedish Grammis Award in the category Song of the Year and a Rockbjörnen Award for Swedish Song of the Year.

The song was included in the soundtrack for the 2004 film Iron Jawed Angels and was covered by Vicci Martinez. The official music video was made available on YouTube channel of Diesel Music, owner of label Superstudio Blå on 8 December 2011.

== Reception ==
Dave Thompson from AllMusic wrote, that the song "sets the scene, a sultry post-blues number infused with just enough of Titiyo's trademark dance sensibility to mask (but never bury) the distinctly PJ Harvey-esque feel of the song itself". Mila Kravchuk from Ukrainian music website @music noted: "We fell in love with this sluggish blues melody, stretching like a molasses, with equal, rhythmic stresses. [...] It's as if this tune was brought from the old gramophone record by Robert Johnson".

== Charts ==
=== Weekly charts ===
Chart (2001)	Peak position
Austria (Ö3 Austria Top 40)	9
Belgium (Ultratop 50 Flanders)	17
Belgium (Ultratop 50 Wallonia)	35
Denmark (Tracklisten)	7
Finland (Suomen virallinen lista)	3
France (SNEP)	13
Germany (GfK)	11
Italy (FIMI)	48
Netherlands (Dutch Top 40)	11
Netherlands (Single Top 100)	20
New Zealand (Recorded Music NZ)	44
Norway (VG-lista)	6
Poland Airplay (Music & Media)	1
Poland (PiF PaF)	1
Russia Airplay (InterMedia)	4
Sweden (Sverigetopplistan)	3
Switzerland (Schweizer Hitparade)	22

=== Year-end charts ===
Chart (2001)	Position
Austria (Ö3 Austria Top 40)	48
Europe (Eurochart Hot 100)	88
Germany (Media Control)	78
Netherlands (Dutch Top 40)	38
Netherlands (Single Top 100)	79
Sweden (Hitlistan)	23
Switzerland (Schweizer Hitparade)	79
