= Lights Over Paris =

American rock band

- Origin: Los Angeles, California, U.S.
- Genres: Rock, pop
- Years active: 2010–2013
- Labels: Type One; Digital
- Past members: Rob Mawhinney; Will Pepper; Devin Bronson; Mike Torres; Dave Gentry

Lights Over Paris was an American rock band formed in Los Angeles, California. Their EP Turn Off the Lights charted at number 6 on Billboard's Heatseekers Albums in August 2010, and the band's music video for the song "Turn Off the Lights" was featured on Yahoo! Music, MTV, VH1 and received over one million views on YouTube. The band also hired artists such as singer Dev and rapper Game to record on its songs. The band is now on an indefinite hiatus due to Robert Mawhinney's conviction and imprisonment for fraudulently obtaining four bank loans in October 2013.

== Career ==
On April 13, 2010, Lights Over Paris released its first EP, Turn Off the Lights, on Digital Records/Type One Records. Three of the EPs' songs, "Melody", "Lime Light Girl" and "Rescue Me", were mixed by noted engineers Tom Lord-Alge and Chris Lord-Alge.

The music video for "Turn Off the Lights" was shot at various locations in Los Angeles. The video was premiered on Yahoo! Music MTV, VH1 and received over one million views on YouTube.

On May 10, 2011, Lights Over Paris released their second single, "I'm Not a Gangsta", on Digital Records/Type One Records featuring rapper The Game, and was the first single off their unreleased album. On August 16, 2011, a remix to the single was released titled "I'm Not a Gangsta (I'm a Gangsta Remix)". The remix featured The Game, YG, Ty Dolla Sign and DJ Mustard.

== Mawhinney's fraud conviction and sentence ==
In January 2013, Mawhinney was arrested in Miami and charged with fraudulently obtaining four bank loans and money laundering totaling over $11 million.

Mawhinney pleaded guilty to the charges in October 2013 and was sentenced to seven years in prison. In a phone interview with 20/20 Mawhinney gave from prison, he stated he was sorry for the deception and was attempting to learn guitar during his incarceration.

=== In media ===
Rob Mawhinney was profiled on the U.S. television show 20/20's "The Big Lie". The show stated Mawhinney had portrayed the band as successful by spending money he had obtained through bank loans using forged or altered documentation, which he had no intention or ability to pay back.

A photo-journalist who had covered the band stated that one club date he attended, being reported as a sellout, had almost more people on stage than in the crowd: Mawhinney had purchased all the tickets in advance. Another scheduled appearance for the band at the Roxy in Los Angeles had a DJ on stage in place of Mawhinney, who was at his high school reunion that night, and saw the DJ being served with legal papers intended for Mawhinney during the show.

== Members ==
Past members

- Rob Mawhinney – vocals
- Will Pepper – keytar
- Devin Bronson – lead guitar
- Mike Torres – bass guitar
- Dave Gentry – drums

== Discography ==
=== EPs ===
- Turn Off the Lights (2010)

=== Singles ===
- "Turn Off the Lights" (2010)
- "I'm Not a Gangsta" (2011)
