= Slave to the Sound =

Studio album by Denise Lopez
- Released: 2003
- Genre: Pop, Dance
- Label: Applalosa Entertainment AB
- Producer: Hit Factory, Streamline, Stereopol, Jabajam, Jocke-E, Godspell, Moe

Denise Lopez chronology
Metaphor (1999)	Slave to the Sound (2003)	Black Lace & Leather (2010)

Singles from Slave to the Sound
- 1. "Last to Know (ft. Laila Adele)" Released: 2003; 2. "Love Me Down" Released: 2003

Slave to the Sound is the fourth studio album by Swedish singer Denise Lopez released in Japan under the title "Like a Queen" (Epic) in July 2002, and by Applalosa Entertainment AB in Sweden in May 2003. The album included the two singles "Last to Know" which featured Laila Adele, and "Love Me Down" both of which music video was made for. "Slave to the Sound" contained 16 new tracks and was the first to be released under Denise's own label.

Denise has co-written all songs but five tracks. Two of the songs ("Sex Dice" and "Karma Sutra") were written by famous singer Dannii Minogue. The album failed to enter the charts worldwide.

== Track listing ==
1. "Slave to the Sound" – 3:22
2. "Love Me Down" – 3:28
3. "Sex Dice" (Dannii Minogue, Lopez) – 3:09
4. "Karma Sutra" (Minogue, Lopez) – 4:00
5. "I Don't Need You Anymore" – 3:24
6. "Masterplan" – 3:13
7. "Like a Queen" – 3:11
8. "Come with Me" – 3:26
9. "Mirror Mirror" – 3:01
10. "Shake Down" – 2:57
11. "Love on Line" – 3:08
12. "Last to Know" – 3:12
13. "More than a Game" – 3:11
14. "Say that You Want It" – 4:01
15. "Just Get It Over With" – 3:21
16. "Someone, Somewhere, Someday" – 2:55

== Release history ==
Region	Date	Label	Format	Catalogue
Japan	July 2002	Epic	CD	
Sweden	May 2003	Applalosa Entertainment AB	CD	7350015350038
