= Come Along (album) =

Studio album by Titiyo
- Released: 20 August 2001
- Genre: Pop; pop rock; blues
- Length: 43:13
- Label: WEA; Superstudio Blå
- Producer: Tore Johansson; Peter Svensson (exec.); Alex Strehl (exec.)

Titiyo chronology
Extended (1997)	Come Along (2001)	Hidden (2008)

Singles from Come Along
- 1. "Come Along" Released: 2001; 2. "1989" Released: 3 December 2001

Come Along is the fourth studio album by Swedish recording artist Titiyo. It was released on August 20, 2001 on WEA/Superstudio Blå. All music was composed by Peter Svensson, lyrics were written by Svensson and Joakim Berg, and production was handled by Tore Johansson. The album's lead single, "Come Along", reached the first place in GLF and was awarded a Swedish Grammis Award in the category Song of the Year. "1989" was released as the second and final single off the album.

== Critical reception ==
Professional ratings
Review scores
Source	Rating
AllMusic	4/5 stars
Blender	1/5 stars

AllMusic editor Dave Thompson reviewed it positively, seeing it as a strong reinvention. He said Titiyo "might never re-create the sheer visceral shock of her debut album," but emphasized that "nobody could ever accuse [her] of standing still," praising the shift into "her rockiest surroundings yet." He ultimately judged it superior to its main influence, calling it "a set that leaves Paus itself in the dust," and concluded she "took the correct" musical direction.

== Track listing ==
All lyrics are written by Peter Svensson and Joakim Berg; all music is composed by Svensson.

No.	Title	Length
1.	"Come Along"	3:42
2.	"1989"	4:06
3.	"Love Has Left Your Eye"	3:56
4.	"My Heart Won"	3:26
5.	"Show"	3:28
6.	"Hold Her Tight"	2:45
7.	"Right or Wrong"	3:31
8.	"I See Good in People"	3:28
9.	"Last Time"	3:15
10.	"Given Thing"	3:53
11.	"Time"	4:33

== Charts ==
=== Weekly charts ===
Chart (2001)	Peak position
Austrian Albums (Ö3 Austria)	25
Danish Albums (Hitlisten)	28
Finnish Albums (Suomen virallinen lista)	17
French Albums (SNEP)	61
German Albums (Offizielle Top 100)	10
Norwegian Albums (VG-lista)	35
Swedish Albums (Sverigetopplistan)	1
Swiss Albums (Schweizer Hitparade)	25

=== Year-end charts ===
Chart (2001)	Position
Swedish Albums (Sverigetopplistan)	13

== Certifications and sales ==
Region	Certification	Certified units/sales
Sweden (GLF)	Platinum	80,000^{^}
Summaries
Europe	—	250,000
^{^} Shipments figures based on certification alone.
