= Built by Girls =

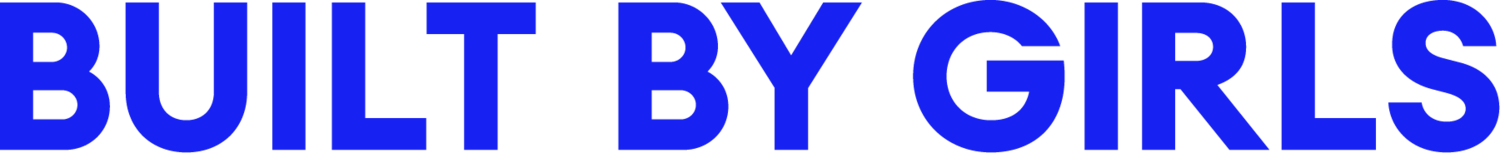
- Website type: Organization
- Available in: English
- Headquarters: {{{location_country}}}
- Parent: Yahoo! Inc.
- Website: www.builtbygirls.com
- Commercial: Yes
- Registration: Optional
- Launched: 2010

Built by Girls (previously known as Cambio), is a New York–based organization that helps girls ages 15–22 get involved in technology by offering mentorship and guidance. The company is owned and operated by Yahoo! Inc.

In 2016, BUILTBYGIRLS launched a campaign that encouraged girls to submit their ideas and solutions to solve some of the problems facing the 62 million girls in the world without access to traditional education. The campaign garnered recognition from First Lady Michelle Obama, who joined forces with the organization to encourage the "Let Girls Build Challenge" project.

In May 2021, it was announced that Verizon had sold Verizon Media to Apollo Global Management for $5 billion. The transaction was closed in September 2021.

== About ==
Cambio.com logo

Cambio launched in 2010 as a partnership between AOL, the Jonas Group, and MGX lab as a next-generation MTV-like video network.

In 2012, AOL acquired Cambio, and in 2014 relaunched it in tandem with a partnership with Girls Who Code when five teenage graduates of the program joined the site as paid interns and helped shape Cambio's editorial mission and site design. During the six-week assignment, the girls focused on two projects: developing a "Celebspiration" meme generator and creating a platform called "Col[lab]" that encourages young women to write articles on any topic for the site.

At its peak, Cambio saw approximately 7.5 million views a month from a predominantly 13- to 34-year-old audience.

== BBG Ventures ==
BBG Ventures is an early-stage fund which grew out of the #BUILTBYGIRLS initiative.
