= Emblem3 =

American band

- Origin: Huntington Beach, California, U.S.
- Genres: Rap rock, pop rock
- Years active: 2007–present
- Members: Jack Mudd; Keaton Stromberg; Wesley Stromberg
- Past members: Drew Chadwick
- Website: emblem3.com

Emblem3 is an American rap rock band from Sequim, Washington, consisting of Wesley Stromberg (born December 6, 1993), Drew Chadwick (born October 1, 1992), and Keaton Stromberg (born July 16, 1996). In 2013, they signed with Simon Cowell's record label Syco Records and Columbia Records after being the tenth contestant eliminated on the second season of The X Factor. Their first single, "Chloe (You're the One I Want)", was released on April 15, 2013, and their debut album, entitled Nothing to Lose, was released on July 30, 2013.

== Career ==
=== Formation ===
While attending middle school in Sequim, Washington, Drew Chadwick and Wesley Stromberg began doing sessions together as American Scholars. At the time, Keaton Stromberg was only nine and was in his own band called Lucky 13 (guitar Keaton, bass Eli Fozio, drums Sara Mobley). While Wesley had moved to Huntington Beach, California with his girlfriend, Chadwick spent high school moving up and down the West Coast, eventually joining Wesley in Huntington Beach. Keaton enrolled in a nearby art school and moved to California to join them. They released an album, Bite Your Lip and Take It under the name The American Scholars, which they produced in their basement. After going through many names, the trio settled on "Emblem3" while in Huntington Beach. They performed locally along the Sunset Strip.

=== 2012: The X Factor ===
In 2012, Emblem3 auditioned in San Francisco for the second season of The X Factor, singing an original song called "Sunset Blvd", written by Chadwick. During bootcamp, they sang "Iris" by the Goo Goo Dolls and at judges' houses, they performed "Every Little Thing She Does Is Magic" by The Police. They were then selected to go on to live shows.

Emblem3 performed "One Day" by Matisyahu during their first live show on October 31. In addition they were selected as the first group to enter the top twelve by Simon Cowell. On the second live show on November 7, the group performed their version of "My Girl" by the Temptations and "California Gurls" by Katy Perry with "What Makes You Beautiful" by One Direction as the background track. After the second live show the group was ranked sixth based on the fan votes and made it to the next week's live shows. On the third live show, they performed "No One" by Alicia Keys and were ranked fourth by the fan votes moving on to week five. On the fourth live show on November 21, 2012, they performed "Secrets" by OneRepublic and were ranked again 4th by the American public. For the fifth live show, they performed "I'm a Believer" by The Monkees and were ranked third. On the sixth live show, the group performed two songs: the first one, chosen by their mentor, was "Just the Way You Are" by Bruno Mars; the second song, chosen by the fans in the Pepsi Challenge, was "Forever Young" by Alphaville. The group was once again ranked third overall by the fans' votes. In the semi-finals, they performed "Baby, I Love Your Way" by Peter Frampton as their own choice and "Hey Jude" by The Beatles as Cowell's choice. They were eliminated on the result show.

==== Performances on The X Factor ====
Show	Theme	Song	Original artist	Order	Result
Audition	Free choice	"Sunset Blvd"	Emblem3	—N/a	Through to bootcamp
Bootcamp 1	Solo performance	"Iris"	Goo Goo Dolls	—N/a	Through to bootcamp 2
Bootcamp 2	Group performance	Not Aired		—N/a	Through to bootcamp 3
Bootcamp 3	Duet performance	Not Aired		—N/a	Through to judges' houses
Judges' houses	Free choice	"Every Little Thing She Does Is Magic"	The Police	—N/a	Through to live shows
Week 1	Made in America	"One Day"	Matisyahu	16	Saved by Simon Cowell
Week 2	Songs from movies	"My Girl/California Gurls/What Makes You Beautiful"	The Temptations/Katy Perry/One Direction	4	Safe (6th)
Week 3	Divas	"No One"	Alicia Keys	11	Safe (4th)
Week 4	Giving Thanks	"Secrets"	OneRepublic	3	Safe (4th)
Week 5	Number-ones	"I'm a Believer"	The Monkees	8	Safe (3rd)
Week 6	Unplugged songs	"Just the Way You Are"	Bruno Mars	2	Safe (3rd)
Week 6	Pepsi Challenge songs	"Forever Young"	Alphaville	8	Safe (3rd)
Semi-final	Contestant's choice	"Baby, I Love Your Way"	Peter Frampton	3	Eliminated (4th)
Semi-final	No theme	"Hey Jude"	The Beatles	7	Eliminated (4th)

=== 2013–2014: Nothing to Lose ===
The trio began to record their debut album, Nothing to Lose, in December 2012. It was released on July 30, 2013. The lead single, "Chloe (You're the One I Want)", peaked at number 93 on the Billboard Hot 100. The second single off the album was "3000 Miles". The band toured to promote their music in their "Goin' Back to Cali Tour" that took place in April 2013. Emblem3 later performed as the opening act for Selena Gomez on her Stars Dance Tour that began in August 2013. On December 5, 2013, Emblem3 had their homecoming performance on The X Factor, singing "Just for One Day". After their performance, they announced their first national headlining tour, "#Bandlife".

Emblem3 released their first EP titled Songs from the Couch, Vol. I on June 2, 2014, independently.

On June 20, 2014, the band announced that band member Drew Chadwick was leaving the band to pursue a solo career. Keaton and Wesley Stromberg released their first EP as a duo titled Forever Together on October 27, 2014.

=== 2015–2017: Waking Up ===
The band reunited in 2016 and released the EP Waking Up, as well as a self-titled app they used to release new music on. In April of the same year, they embarked their Waking Up world tour.

The band went on hiatus again due to problems with the office and differences in direction among the members.

=== 2019: Pyro ===
Drew and Wesley released a hip-hop inspired EP, Pyro, under the name Emblem3 while Keaton was working with another band, The Social.

=== 2020–present ===
The band reunited again in 2020, with Keaton rejoining the band and resumed work on the single Jaiden. In 2021, they released three singles: "Champagne Dreams", "Eyes Wide Open", and "So Proud".

In 2023 they released "Songs from the Couch, Vol. 2", a follow-up to their 2014 album.

In March 2025 Drew announced his departure from the band to pursue a solo career. He was replaced by Jack Mudd.

== Discography ==
=== Studio albums ===
Title	Album details	Peak chart positions				Sales
Title	Album details	US	US Digital	CAN	NZ	Sales
Nothing to Lose	Released: July 30, 2013; Label: Syco, Columbia, Mr. Kanani; Format: CD, digital download	7	6	8	21	US: 70,000
Songs from the Couch, Vol. 1	Released: June 2, 2014	53	22	—	—	
Songs from the Couch, Vol. 2	Released: February 8, 2023	—	—	—	—	

=== Extended plays ===
Title	EP details	Peak chart positions	
Title	EP details	US	US Digital
Forever Together	Released: October 27, 2014; Label: EMBLEM3; Format: Digital download	56	21
Waking Up	Released: February 16, 2016; Label: EMBLEM3; Format: Digital download	—	—
Pyro	Released: October 25, 2019; Label: EMBLEM3; Format: Digital download	—	—

=== Singles ===
Year	Single	Peak chart positions						Sales	Album
Year	Single	US	US Digital	US Heat	US Pop	CAN	KOR	Sales	Album
2013	"Chloe (You're the One I Want)"	93	67	7	25	87	93	US: 330,000	Nothing to Lose
2013	"3000 Miles"	—	—	—	—	—	—		Nothing to Lose
2016	"Taboo Love"	—	—	—	—	—	—		Waking Up
2016	"End of the Summer"	—	—	—	—	—	—		Waking Up
2017	"Too Pretty (For Your Own Good)"	—	—	—	—	—	—		Non-album singles
2017	"Homerun"	—	—	—	—	—	—		Non-album singles
2017	"New Day"	—	—	—	—	—	—		Non-album singles
2017	"Corona and Lime"	—	—	—	—	—	—		Non-album singles
2020	"Jaiden"	—	—	—	—	—	—		Non-album singles
2021	"Champagne Dreams"	—	—	—	—	—	—		Non-album singles
2021	"Eyes Wide Open"	—	—	—	—	—	—		Non-album singles
2021	"So Proud"	—	—	—	—	—	—		Non-album singles
2021	"Walking Dead"	—	—	—	—	—	—		Non-album singles
2022	"Sunset Blvd (10 Year Anniversary)"	—	—	—	—	—	—		Non-album singles
2022	"Rush"	—	—	—	—	—	—		Songs from the Couch, Vol. 2
2022	"My Year"	—	—	—	—	—	—		Songs from the Couch, Vol. 2
2023	"Burning Man"	—	—	—	—	—	—		Non-album single
2023	"We Made It (King of the Belmont Shore)"	—	—	—	—	—	—		Songs from the Couch, Vol. 2
2023	"Nirvana"	—	—	—	—	—	—		Songs from the Couch, Vol. 2
2023	"Free Ride"	—	—	—	—	—	—		Non-album singles
2024	"Looks to Kill"	—	—	—	—	—	—		Non-album singles

=== As featured artist ===
Year	Title	Album
2014	"Cheat Codes" (Jack & Jack featuring Emblem3)	Non-album singles
2023	"Supermodel Mode" (Supermodels featuring Emblem3)	Non-album singles
2023	"Jessie" (Supermodels featuring Emblem3)	Non-album singles
2023	"Won't Forget" (Supermodels featuring Emblem3)	Non-album singles
2024	"Dream Squad" (Supermodels featuring Emblem3)	Non-album singles
2024	"Miss Teen USA" (Supermodels featuring Emblem3)	Non-album singles
2024	"Miss USA" (Supermodels featuring Emblem3)	Non-album singles
2024	"Living the Dream" (Supermodels featuring Emblem3)	Non-album singles
2025	"Forever 25" (Supermodels featuring Emblem3)	Non-album singles
2025	"Stormy" (Supermodels featuring Emblem3)	Non-album singles

== Awards and nominations ==
Year	Award	Category	Nominee/Work	Outcome
2013	Teen Choice Awards	Choice Music: Breakout Group	Emblem3	Won
2013	Teen Icon Awards	Icon of Tomorrow	Emblem3	Nominated
2013	Teen Icon Awards	Iconic Viner	Wesley Stromberg	Nominated
2013	Capricho Awards	Gato Internacional (International Cutie)	Drew Chadwick	Nominated
2013	Capricho Awards	Melhor Show no Brasil (Best Show in Brazil)	Emblem3	Nominated
2013	Capricho Awards	Revelação Internacional (International Development)	Emblem3	Nominated
2014	Radio Disney Music Awards	Best Crush Song - XOXO	"Chloe (You're the One I Want)"	Nominated
2014	Radio Disney Music Awards	Best Music Group - They're the One	Emblem3	Nominated

== Tours ==
- West Coast Tour (2013)
- E3 Goes East (2013)
- Goin' Back to Cali (2013)
- Emblem3 Summer Tour (2013)
- Stars Dance Tour (Opening Act) (2013)
- #Bandlife Tour (2014) (opening acts included MKTO and Jackson Guthy)
- Fireside Story Sessions (2014)
- Forever Together Tour (late 2014)
- Waking Up Tour (2016) (opening acts include Megan Nicole, Dyllan Murray, and The Ready Set)
- Eyes Wide Open Tour (2021) (opening acts include THE SOCIAL, Tiffany Stringer)
- Songs from the Couch Tour (2023)
- The North American Tour (2023)
- Super Happy Story Time Tour (2024)

The group also performed at multiple festivals throughout the year such as Z-Fest (Brazil), Kiss Concert (Boston, MA), various holiday concerts, Spring Break Portugal etc.

The group is also scheduled to perform at music festivals and concert series throughout the summer such as Ramapo Summer Concert Series (NY) etc.

The group also has done shows with many other artists such as Jack & Jack (Jack Gilinsky and Jack Johnson)
