= List of recurring actors in the James Bond film series =

This is a list of actors that have appeared physically (but not always characteristically) in the Eon Productions series of the James Bond film series more than once.

== MI6 Branch: Universal Exports – United Kingdom ==
=== M – Head of MI-6 ===
==== Bernard Lee ====
In the Bond films, Bernard Lee's character, M, is Admiral Sir Miles Messervy (only ever named, besides as 'M', as 'Admiral' and 'Miles' on screen in his appearances), Bond's irascible boss who sends him out on assignments. He also portrays M along with Lois Maxwell as Moneypenny in the 1975 French comedy " Bons baisers de Hong Kong". Lee was succeeded by Robert Brown, though not necessarily playing the same character (Brown had played another admiral in the series previously).

Dame Judi Dench, a friend of Lee, would later take over the role of a brand-new M, starting in 1995 with some references to her predecessor, including an oil painting of Lee in the role seen in MI6's secondary HQ (a Scottish castle).

Lee starred in eleven James Bond films.

- Dr. No (1962)
- From Russia with Love (1963)
- Goldfinger (1964)
- Thunderball (1965)
- You Only Live Twice (1967)
- On Her Majesty's Secret Service (1969)
- Diamonds Are Forever (1971)
- Live and Let Die (1973)
- The Man with the Golden Gun (1974)
- The Spy Who Loved Me (1977)
- Moonraker (1979)

==== Robert Brown ====
After Lee's death in 1981, the producers hired actor Robert Brown to continue the role in the Bond films. Brown picks up the role in Octopussy, however it is never explicitly stated on screen whether Robert Brown's character is intended to be the same person played by Lee, if he was intended to be Admiral Hargreaves, the role played by Brown in 1977's The Spy Who Loved Me, or if he is supposed to be another character altogether.

Brown played M in the following James Bond films:

- Octopussy (1983)
- A View to a Kill (1985)
- The Living Daylights (1987)
- Licence to Kill (1989)

==== Judi Dench ====
In 1995, Dame Judi Dench became known to an international audience after taking over the role of M starting with GoldenEye and continuing through all of the Pierce Brosnan films. She is the only actor from Brosnan's era to remain in the rebooted franchise featuring Daniel Craig, starring in 2006's Casino Royale, 2008's Quantum of Solace, and 2012's Skyfall, followed by a cameo in 2015's Spectre. A painting of Dench's M is shown at the relocated MI6 headquarters in 2021's No Time to Die. Dench played M in a total of eight films.

- GoldenEye (1995)
- Tomorrow Never Dies (1997)
- The World Is Not Enough (1999)
- Die Another Day (2002)
- Casino Royale (2006)
- Quantum of Solace (2008)
- Skyfall (2012)
- Spectre (2015)

==== Ralph Fiennes ====
In 2012, following the death of Judi Dench's M in Skyfall, the character of Gareth Mallory (Ralph Fiennes) takes over from her in the role as M.

Fiennes played M in the following films:

- Skyfall (2012)
- Spectre (2015)
- No Time to Die (2021)

=== Q – Quartermaster ===
==== Desmond Llewelyn ====
Starting with the second film in the James Bond series, From Russia with Love (1963), Desmond Llewelyn appeared as Q (the quartermaster of the MI6 gadget lab known as Q-branch) in every Bond film, except Live and Let Die (1973), until The World Is Not Enough (1999). He had originally been chosen for the role as he had previously worked with the director Terence Young on the 1950 war film They Were Not Divided. In the 2002 film Die Another Day, John Cleese, who played the character R, the assistant to Q in The World Is Not Enough, was promoted to the head of Q-branch, thus taking on the title of Q. In all, Llewelyn appeared in 17 Bond films, more than any other actor, and worked with the first five James Bond actors. He also portrayed Q in a 1967 made-for-television special (produced by Eon Productions) entitled, Welcome to Japan, Mr. Bond which was included in the 2006 special edition DVD release of You Only Live Twice.

Desmond Llewelyn appears as Major Boothroyd/Q in the following films:

- From Russia with Love (1963)
- Goldfinger (1964)
- Thunderball (1965)
- You Only Live Twice (1967)
- On Her Majesty's Secret Service (1969)
- Diamonds are Forever (1971)
- The Man with the Golden Gun (1974)
- The Spy Who Loved Me (1977)
- Moonraker (1979)
- For Your Eyes Only (1981)
- Octopussy (1983)
- A View to a Kill (1985)
- The Living Daylights (1987)
- Licence to Kill (1989)
- Goldeneye (1995)
- Tomorrow Never Dies (1997)
- The World Is Not Enough (1999)

==== John Cleese ====
In 1999, comedian John Cleese appeared in the James Bond movie, The World Is Not Enough as Q's assistant, referred to by Bond as R. In 2002, when Cleese reprised his role in Die Another Day, the character was promoted, making Cleese the new quartermaster (Q) of MI6. In 2004, Cleese was featured as Q in the video game James Bond 007: Everything or Nothing, featuring his likeness and voice.

Cleese appears as R/Q in the following films:

- The World Is Not Enough (1999)
- Die Another Day (2002)

==== Ben Whishaw ====
Actor Ben Whishaw took over the role in 2012's Skyfall. Q was absent from the two previous movies, Casino Royale and Quantum of Solace and it was Daniel Craig who had expressed concern over the character's absence, and expressed his hope that Q would return in Skyfall.

Whishaw appears as Q in the following films:

- Skyfall (2012)
- Spectre (2015)
- No Time to Die (2021)

=== Moneypenny – Secretary ===
==== Lois Maxwell ====
Lois Maxwell lobbied for the role in James Bond, as her husband had had a heart attack and they needed the money. Director Terence Young, who once had turned her down on the grounds that she looked like she "smelled of soap", offered her either Moneypenny or the recurring Bond girlfriend, Sylvia Trench, but she was uncomfortable with a revealing scene the latter had in the screenplay. The role as M's secretary guaranteed just two days' work at £100 per day; Maxwell supplied her own clothes. The Trench character, however, was eliminated after From Russia with Love.

In 1967, Maxwell angered Sean Connery for a time by appearing in the Italian spy spoof Operation Kid Brother with the star's brother Neil Connery and Bernard Lee. In 1971, Maxwell was nearly replaced for Diamonds Are Forever after demanding a pay raise; her policewoman's cap disguises hair she had already dyed for another role. In 1975, she plays Moneypenny weeping for the death of James Bond in a short scene with Bernard Lee as M in the French comedy Bons Baisers de Hong Kong. For the filming of A View to a Kill, her final appearance, Bond producer Albert "Cubby" Broccoli told her that the two of them were the only ones from Dr. No still working on the series. Maxwell asked that her character be killed off, but Broccoli recast the role instead.

As Moneypenny, according to author Tom Lisanti, she was seen as an "anchor", with her flirtatious repartee with Bond lending the films realism and humanism. For Moneypenny, Bond was "unobtainable", freeing the characters to make outrageous sexual double entendres. At the same time, her character did little to imbue the series with changing feminist notions.

As Miss Moneypenny

- Dr. No (1962)
- From Russia with Love (1963)
- Goldfinger (1964)
- Thunderball (1965)
- You Only Live Twice (1967)
- On Her Majesty's Secret Service (1969)
- Diamonds are Forever (1971)
- Live and Let Die (1973)
- The Man with the Golden Gun (1974)
- The Spy Who Loved Me (1977)
- Moonraker (1979)
- For Your Eyes Only (1981)
- Octopussy (1983)
- A View to a Kill (1985)

==== Caroline Bliss ====
Caroline Bliss was only featured in two James Bond movies (the only two Timothy Dalton starred in as James Bond). Although, her role in Licence to Kill was little more than a cameo. She is the only actress to play Moneypenny while wearing glasses. She is also the youngest actress to play Moneypenny.

- The Living Daylights (1987)
- Licence to Kill (1989)

==== Samantha Bond ====
Samantha Bond starred in four James Bond films as Miss Moneypenny. She retired from her role with the departure of Pierce Brosnan as James Bond.

She appeared as Miss Moneypenny in:

- GoldenEye (1995)
- Tomorrow Never Dies (1997)
- The World Is Not Enough (1999)
- Die Another Day (2002)

In a commercial for London's 2012 Olympic bid, Bond once again suited up as Miss Moneypenny. She appeared alongside Roger Moore, who played 007 between 1973 and 1985.

==== Naomie Harris ====
The role of Miss Moneypenny was not cast in the following Bond films, Casino Royale and Quantum of Solace. The character eventually returned in the 2012 film, Skyfall, under the alias 'Eve', played by Naomie Harris. It is only at the end of Skyfall that agent 'Eve' is revealed to be Moneypenny.

Harris played Moneypenny in the following films:

- Skyfall (2012)
- Spectre (2015)
- No Time to Die (2021)

=== Sir Frederick Gray, the Minister of Defence ===
==== Geoffrey Keen ====
He played the role of Frederick Gray, the Minister of Defence in six James Bond films between 1977 and 1987:

- The Spy Who Loved Me (1977) (in this film Bond calls him "Freddie" – in private, after the briefing at the naval base – when Gray tells him that he is to go to Egypt.)
- Moonraker (1979)
- For Your Eyes Only (1981)
- Octopussy (1983)
- A View to a Kill (1985)
- The Living Daylights (1987)

=== Bill Tanner – Chief of Staff ===
==== Michael Kitchen ====
Michael Kitchen appeared in two Bond films GoldenEye and The World Is Not Enough.

- GoldenEye (1995)
- The World Is Not Enough (1999)

==== Rory Kinnear ====
Rory Kinnear appeared as Bill Tanner in the four latest Bond films: Quantum of Solace, Skyfall, Spectre and No Time to Die.

- Quantum of Solace (2008)
- Skyfall (2012)
- Spectre (2015)
- No Time to Die (2021)

=== Charles Robinson – Chief of Staff ===
==== Colin Salmon ====
Colin Salmon appeared in three Bond films as Chief of Staff Charles Robinson: Tomorrow Never Dies, The World Is Not Enough and Die Another Day.

- Tomorrow Never Dies (1997)
- The World Is Not Enough (1999)
- Die Another Day (2002)

== Central Intelligence Agency/US Armed Forces – United States ==
=== Agent Felix Leiter ===
==== David Hedison ====
David Hedison played James Bond's ally Felix Leiter in Live and Let Die and Licence to Kill.

As Felix Leiter:

- Live and Let Die (1973)
- Licence to Kill (1989)

==== Jeffrey Wright ====
In 2006, Jeffrey Wright featured as Felix Leiter in the 21st Bond movie, Casino Royale. This makes him the first African-American man to play the character in an Eon-produced Bond film (Bernie Casey played Leiter in the non-Eon Never Say Never Again). He also reprised the role in Quantum of Solace, and like David Hedison before him appeared as Leiter more than once.

As Felix Leiter:

- Casino Royale (2006)
- Quantum of Solace (2008)
- No Time to Die (2021)

=== General Brad Whitaker/Agent Jack Wade ===
==== Joe Don Baker ====
In 1987, Joe Don Baker got the role of the villain Brad Whitaker in the Bond film The Living Daylights, starring Timothy Dalton as James Bond. In 1995 and 1997 Baker returned to the series, this time playing a different character, CIA agent Jack Wade, in GoldenEye and Tomorrow Never Dies with Pierce Brosnan as Bond.

The character of Wade is similar to that of CIA agent Darius Jedburgh, played by Baker in the 1985 BBC Television serial Edge of Darkness. He was nominated for "Best Actor" by the British Academy Television Awards. This serial was directed by Martin Campbell, who also cast Baker as Wade in GoldenEye.

As General Brad Whitaker:

- The Living Daylights (1987)

As CIA Agent Jack Wade:

- GoldenEye (1995)
- Tomorrow Never Dies (1997)

== Other actors ==
=== Michael G. Wilson ===
In 1972 Michael G. Wilson joined Eon Productions, the production company responsible for the James Bond film series dating back to 1962 that began with his stepfather Albert R. 'Cubby' Broccoli and Harry Saltzman. Wilson specifically worked in Eon Productions's legal department until taking a more active role as an assistant to Cubby Broccoli for the film The Spy Who Loved Me (1977). In 1979 Wilson became executive producer of the film Moonraker and since has been an executive producer or producer in every James Bond film, currently co-producing with his half-sister Barbara.

Cameo Roles

- Goldfinger (1964) – soldier at Fort Knox (uncredited)
- The Spy Who Loved Me (1977) – audience member at pyramid show (uncredited)
- Moonraker (1979) – tourist in Venice; NASA technician (uncredited)
- For Your Eyes Only (1981) – priest at Greek wedding (uncredited)
- Octopussy (1983) – member of Soviet Security Council; tourist on river boat in India (uncredited)
- A View to a Kill (1985) – voice heard when Bond enters San Francisco city hall (uncredited)
- The Living Daylights (1987) – audience member at Vienna Opera House (uncredited)
- Licence to Kill (1989) – voice of DEA agent in pre-title sequence "If they hurry, they might just be able to grab the bastard" (uncredited)
- GoldenEye (1995) – member of Russian Security Council (uncredited)
- Tomorrow Never Dies (1997) – Tom Wallace, Carver employee, appearing in video conference scene "Consider him slimed" (uncredited)
- The World Is Not Enough (1999) – employee in Baku casino scene (uncredited)
- Die Another Day (2002) – General Chandler (credited); tourist leaning against car in Havana (uncredited)
- Casino Royale (2006) – corrupt Montenegrin police chief (credited)
- Quantum of Solace (2008) – Man sitting in green armchair in Haitian hotel lobby (uncredited)
- Skyfall (2012) – Pallbearer at the funeral of MI6 agents (scene cut from final film)
- Spectre (2015) – Government official seen discussing positive result of Nine Eyes vote with Max Denbigh (C), alongside his son Gregg Wilson in his first cameo appearance.
- No Time to Die (2021) - Military Officer at Spectre Party (uncredited)

=== Walter Gotell ===
A German-British actor, Walter Gotell plays General Gogol, head of the KGB, in multiple Bond films.

Gotell won the role of General Alexis Gogol in The Spy Who Loved Me for being a look-alike of the former head of Soviet secret police Lavrentiy Beria. His first role in the James Bond films came in 1963, when he played the henchman Morzeny in From Russia with Love. Starting in the late 1970s, he played the recurring role of General Gogol in the James Bond series, beginning with The Spy Who Loved Me in 1977. The character returned in Moonraker (1979), For Your Eyes Only (1981), Octopussy (1983), A View to a Kill (1985) and The Living Daylights (1987). As the Cold War developed, the role of leader of the KGB was seen to change attitudes to the West – from direct competitor to collaborator. His final appearance, as the Cold War began to become less imminent, sees him transferred to a different, more diplomatic role.

Morzeny

- From Russia with Love (1963)

General Anatol / Alexis Gogol

- The Spy Who Loved Me (1977)
- Moonraker (1979)
- For Your Eyes Only (1981)
- Octopussy (1983)
- A View to a Kill (1985)
- The Living Daylights (1987)

=== Diane Hartford ===
Hartford, née Brown, appeared in two EON films, 41 years apart. In Thunderball, she dances impromptu with Bond at the Kiss Kiss Club before Fiona Volpe cuts in. Her character presumes Volpe to be Bond's wife. Hartford was married at the time to Huntington Hartford who owned Paradise Island, a filming location for the film. In 2006's Casino Royale, she sits directly across from Bond when he plays poker against Dimitrios at the Ocean Club, founded by her ex-husband, again on Paradise Island.

- Thunderball (1965) – uncredited
- Casino Royale (2006) – Card Player

=== Eva Reuber-Staier ===
Austrian actress Eva Rueber-Staier plays General Gogol's assistant Rublevitch in three of the four Bond films (name spelled differently each time): The Spy Who Loved Me as Rubelvitch; For Your Eyes Only as Rublevich; and Octopussy as Rublevitch. Virginia Hey played Rubavitch (same character, different spelling) in The Living Daylights.

- The Spy Who Loved Me (1977) – Rubelvitch
- For Your Eyes Only (1981) – Rublevich
- Octopussy (1983) – Rublevitch

=== Jeremy Bulloch ===
Jeremy Bulloch played a submariner in The Spy Who Loved Me and then Q's assistant in For Your Eyes Only and Octopussy:

- The Spy Who Loved Me (1977) – Submariner aboard HMS Ranger
- For Your Eyes Only (1981) – Smithers
- Octopussy (1983) – Smithers

=== Jesper Christensen ===
Jesper Christensen plays the role of Mr. White in Casino Royale, Quantum of Solace and Spectre. He is the first actor to play the same villain in more than two films, and the first to reprise a belligerent character since Richard Kiel in Moonraker (1979).

- Casino Royale (2006)
- Quantum of Solace (2008)
- Spectre (2015)

=== Anthony Dawson ===
Throughout his career Anthony Dawson could often be found in the films of director Terence Young, including the aforementioned Dr. No, They Were Not Divided (1950),Valley of Eagles (1951), The Amorous Adventures of Moll Flanders (1965), Triple Cross (1966), Red Sun (1971), Inchon (1981), and The Jigsaw Man (1983). Young also cast him as the physical presence of Ernst Stavro Blofeld in his Bond films From Russia with Love (1963), and Thunderball (1965), stroking the ubiquitous white cat. His face was never seen though, and Blofeld's voice was provided by Eric Pohlmann.

Dawson is the only actor to play arch-villain role of Blofeld more than once.

- Dr. No (1962) – Professor Dent
- From Russia with Love (1963) – Ernst Stavro Blofeld (physical appearance)
- Thunderball (1965) – Ernst Stavro Blofeld (physical appearance)

=== Maud Adams ===
Swedish actress Maud Adams plays two different Bond girls in two James Bond films, The Man with the Golden Gun (1974) and as the title character in Octopussy (1983). She was also an extra in A View to a Kill (1985).

- The Man with the Golden Gun (1974) – Andrea Anders
- Octopussy (1983) – Octopussy
- A View to a Kill (1985) – Bystander

=== George Baker ===
British actor George Baker, who originally appeared in an uncredited role as a NASA engineer in You Only Live Twice (1967), also portrays Sir Hilary Bray in On Her Majesty's Secret Service and Captain Benson in The Spy Who Loved Me (1977).

- You Only Live Twice (1967) – NASA Engineer (uncredited)
- On Her Majesty's Secret Service (1969) – Sir Hilary Bray
- The Spy Who Loved Me (1977) – Captain Benson

=== Shane Rimmer ===
Shane Rimmer played three different characters in three films. He also provided (uncredited) voice over-dubbing for the character of Hamilton in Live and Let Die (1973).

- You Only Live Twice (1967) – Hawaii Radar Operator (uncredited)
- Diamonds Are Forever (1971) – Tom (uncredited)
- The Spy Who Loved Me (1977) – Commander Carter (USS Wayne)

=== Vincent Wong ===
Vincent Wong plays General Li in Die Another Day (2002). He has two uncredited appearances also.

- Diamonds Are Forever (1971) – Casino Croupier (uncredited)
- The Spy Who Loved Me (1977) – Liparus Guard (uncredited)
- Die Another Day (2002) – General Li

=== Eunice Gayson ===
Eunice Gayson plays Sylvia Trench, James Bond's fetching girlfriend in the first two Bond films (Dr. No and From Russia with Love). Originally, Gayson was going to be cast as Miss Moneypenny, but the part went to Lois Maxwell instead. Gayson was originally to have been a regular in the Bond film series, but her character, Sylvia Trench, was dropped.

Appearances as Sylvia Trench

- Dr. No (1962)
- From Russia with Love (1963)

=== Clifton James ===
Clifton James plays the role of Sheriff J.W. Pepper in Live and Let Die and The Man with the Golden Gun.

As Sheriff John W. Pepper, Louisiana State Law Enforcement.

- Live and Let Die (1973)
- The Man with the Golden Gun (1974)

=== Richard Kiel ===
American actor Richard Kiel plays the steel-toothed Jaws in the James Bond movies The Spy Who Loved Me (1977) and Moonraker (1979) as well as the video game Everything or Nothing, and Mr. Larson in Happy Gilmore. He stands at a towering height of 7 feet 2 inches (2.18 m).

As Jaws:

- The Spy Who Loved Me (1977)
- Moonraker (1979)

=== Robbie Coltrane ===
Robbie Coltrane plays the role of Valentin Dmitrovich Zukovsky in GoldenEye and The World Is Not Enough.

As Valentin Dmitrovich Zukovsky, a Russian Mafia head

- GoldenEye (1995)
- The World Is Not Enough (1999)

=== Giancarlo Giannini ===
Italian actor Giancarlo Giannini plays René Mathis in Casino Royale (2006) and Quantum of Solace (2008).

- Casino Royale (2006)
- Quantum of Solace (2008)

=== Léa Seydoux ===
French actress Léa Seydoux plays Madeleine Swann in Spectre (2015) and No Time to Die (2020).

- Spectre (2015)
- No Time to Die (2021)

=== Brigitte Millar ===
English actress Brigitte Millar plays (Doctor) Vogel in Spectre (2015) and No Time to Die (2020).

- Spectre (2015)
- No Time to Die (2021)

=== Charles Gray ===
Charles Gray appears as Ernst Stavro Blofeld in Diamonds Are Forever (1971). In the earlier You Only Live Twice (1967), he had played a British agent, Henderson, (though Australian in the novel) making him one of a small number of actors to have played a villain and a Bond ally in the series.

- You Only Live Twice (1967) – Richard "Dikko" Henderson
- Diamonds Are Forever (1971) – Ernst Stavro Blofeld (and his many "doubles")

=== Nadja Regin ===
Serbian actress Nadja Regin plays Kerim's girl in From Russia with Love (1963) and Bonita in Goldfinger (1964).

- From Russia with Love (1963) as Kerim's Girl
- Goldfinger (1964) as Bonita

=== Martine Beswick ===
Martine Beswick has two appearances in the James Bond film series. Although she auditioned for the first Bond film Dr. No, she was cast in the second film From Russia with Love as the fiery gypsy girl Zora. She engaged in the famous "catfight" scene with her rival Vida (played by former Miss Israel Aliza Gur). She was incorrectly billed as "Martin Beswick" in the title sequence. Beswick then appeared as the ill-fated Paula Caplan in Thunderball. She had been away from the Caribbean so long that she was required to sunbathe constantly for two weeks before filming, in order to look like a local.

Martine Beswick film appearances in the James Bond film series:

- From Russia with Love (1962) – Zora
- Thunderball (1965) – Paula Kaplan

=== Burt Kwouk ===
Burt Kwouk played Mr. Ling in Goldfinger (1964) and Spectre 3 in You Only Live Twice (1967).

- Goldfinger (1964) as Mr Ling
- You Only Live Twice (1967) as Spectre 3

=== Milton Reid ===
Milton Reid plays Sandor in The Spy Who Loved Me (1977).

- Dr. No (1962) – Dr.No's Guard (uncredited)
- The Spy Who Loved Me (1977) – Sandor

=== George Roubicek ===
Austrian actor George Roubicek plays an American astronaut in You Only Live Twice (1967) and Stromberg One Captain in The Spy Who Loved Me (1977).

- You Only Live Twice (1967) – American Astronaut
- The Spy Who Loved Me (1977) – Stromberg One Captain

=== Marc Lawrence ===
Marc Lawrence played a Slumber Inc. attendant in Diamonds Are Forever (1971) and Rodney in The Man with the Golden Gun (1974).

- Diamonds Are Forever (1971) – Slumber Inc. Attendant
- The Man with the Golden Gun (1974) – Rodney

=== Albert Moses ===
Sri Lankan actor Albert Moses plays a Barman in The Spy Who Loved Me (1977) and Saddrudin, an undercover British agent, in Octopussy (1983).

- The Spy Who Loved Me (1977) – Barman
- Octopussy (1983) – Saddrudin

=== Nadim Sawalha ===
Jordanian actor Nadim Sawalha plays Aziz Fekkesh in The Spy Who Loved Me (1977) and a Tangier police chief in The Living Daylights (1987).

- The Spy Who Loved Me (1977) – Aziz Fekkesh
- The Living Daylights (1987) – Tangier police chief

=== Mary Stävin ===
Swedish actress Mary Stävin appears in two Bond films, Octopussy (1983) and A View to a Kill (1985).

- Octopussy (1983) – Octopussy Girl
- A View to a Kill (1985) – Kimberley Jones

=== Tsai Chin ===
Chin (also known as Irene Chow) is probably best known for her role as Lin Tang, the diabolic daughter of Dr. Fu Manchu in the Christopher Lee Fu Manchu movies. She is also memorable for her role as Ling in pre-titles sequence of the James Bond movie You Only Live Twice and in the role of "Juicy Lucy" in The Virgin Soldiers. She continues to appear in films to this day, including The Joy Luck Club, Memoirs of a Geisha, and the 2006 James Bond film Casino Royale. She also has a recurring role in Grey's Anatomy as Helen Rubenstein, the mother of Cristina Yang.

She also made an appearance with Christopher Lee in the Fu Manchu films who played bond villain Francisco Scaramanga in The Man with the Golden Gun.

- You Only Live Twice (1967) – Ling
- Casino Royale (2006) – Madam Wu

=== Richard Graydon ===
Richard Graydon appeared twice in uncredited roles, in On Her Majesty's Secret Service (1969) and Moonraker (1979), and twice more as a Russian Cosmonaut in You Only Live Twice (1967) and as Francisco the Fearless in Octopussy (1983).

- You Only Live Twice (1967) – Russian Cosmonaut
- On Her Majesty's Secret Service (1969) – Draco's Driver (uncredited)
- Moonraker (1979) – Space Fighter (uncredited)
- Octopussy (1983) – Francisco the Fearless

=== Bob Simmons ===
British actor Bob Simmons, although uncredited, is notable in appearing as 007 in the pre-title sequences of the first three Bond films. He also appeared, uncredited, in the roles of three villains in later films.

- Dr. No (1962) – James Bond in Gunbarrel Sequence (uncredited)
- From Russia with Love (1963) – James Bond in Gunbarrel Sequence (uncredited)
- Goldfinger (1964) – James Bond in Gunbarrel Sequence (uncredited)
- Thunderball (1965) – Colonel Jacque Bouvar – Spectre 6 (uncredited)
- The Spy Who Loved Me (1977) – Ivan, KGB Thug (uncredited)
- For Your Eyes Only (1981) – Henchman Lotus Explosion Victim (uncredited)

=== David de Keyser ===
British actor David de Keyser voice dubbed (uncredited) Marc Ange Draco in On Her Majesty's Secret Service (1969), and played a doctor in Diamonds Are Forever (1971).

- On Her Majesty's Secret Service (1969) – Marc Ange Draco (voice, uncredited)
- Diamonds Are Forever (1971) – Doctor

== Voice over-dubbing only ==
=== Nikki van der Zyl ===
Nikki van der Zyl was heard in ten Bond films providing voice over-dubbing.

- Dr. No (1962; dubbed many female voices)
- From Russia with Love (1963; dubbed Eunice Gayson and female hotel clerk in Istanbul)
- Goldfinger (1964; dubbed Shirley Eaton and Nadja Regin, was also on-set English-language vocal coach to Gert Fröbe)
- Thunderball (1965; dubbed Claudine Auger)
- You Only Live Twice (1967; dubbed Mie Hama)
- On Her Majesty's Secret Service (1969; dubbed Virginia North)
- Diamonds Are Forever (1971; dubbed Denise Perrier)
- Live and Let Die (1973; partially dubbed Jane Seymour)
- The Man with the Golden Gun (1974; dubbed Francoise Therry)
- Moonraker (1979; dubbed Corinne Clery and Leila Shenna)

=== Eric Pohlmann ===
Eric Pohlmann voice dubbed Ernst Stavro Blofeld for Anthony Dawson in both films they were in together.

- From Russia with Love (1963) – dubbed Ernst Stavro Blofeld
- Thunderball (1965) – again dubbed Ernst Stavro Blofeld

== Actors in recurring roles ==
(Two or more film appearances)

Key:

actor	Character portrayer

Character	Dr. No	From Russia with Love	Goldfinger	Thunderball	You Only Live Twice	On Her Majesty's Secret Service	Diamonds Are Forever	Live and Let Die	The Man with the Golden Gun	The Spy Who Loved Me	Moonraker	For Your Eyes Only	Octopussy	A View to a Kill	The Living Daylights	Licence to Kill	GoldenEye	Tomorrow Never Dies	The World Is Not Enough	Die Another Day	Casino Royale	Quantum of Solace	Skyfall	Spectre	No Time to Die
Year	62	63	64	65	67	69	71	73	74	77	79	81	83	85	87	89	95	97	99	02	06	08	12	15	21
James Bond	Sean Connery	Sean Connery	Sean Connery	Sean Connery	Sean Connery	George Lazenby	Sean Connery	Roger Moore	Roger Moore	Roger Moore	Roger Moore	Roger Moore	Roger Moore	Roger Moore	Timothy Dalton	Timothy Dalton	Pierce Brosnan	Pierce Brosnan	Pierce Brosnan	Pierce Brosnan	Daniel Craig	Daniel Craig	Daniel Craig	Daniel Craig	Daniel Craig
Miss Moneypenny	Lois Maxwell	Lois Maxwell	Lois Maxwell	Lois Maxwell	Lois Maxwell	Lois Maxwell	Lois Maxwell	Lois Maxwell	Lois Maxwell	Lois Maxwell	Lois Maxwell	Lois Maxwell	Lois Maxwell	Lois Maxwell	Caroline Bliss	Caroline Bliss	Samantha Bond	Samantha Bond	Samantha Bond	Samantha Bond			Naomie Harris	Naomie Harris	Naomie Harris
M	Bernard Lee	Bernard Lee	Bernard Lee	Bernard Lee	Bernard Lee	Bernard Lee	Bernard Lee	Bernard Lee	Bernard Lee	Bernard Lee	Bernard Lee		Robert Brown (British actor)	Robert Brown (British actor)	Robert Brown (British actor)	Robert Brown (British actor)	Judi Dench	Judi Dench	Judi Dench	Judi Dench	Judi Dench	Judi Dench	Judi Dench	Ralph Fiennes	Ralph Fiennes
Q	Peter Burton	Desmond Llewelyn	Desmond Llewelyn	Desmond Llewelyn	Desmond Llewelyn	Desmond Llewelyn	Desmond Llewelyn		Desmond Llewelyn	Desmond Llewelyn	Desmond Llewelyn	Desmond Llewelyn	Desmond Llewelyn	Desmond Llewelyn	Desmond Llewelyn	Desmond Llewelyn	Desmond Llewelyn	Desmond Llewelyn	Desmond Llewelyn	John Cleese			Ben Whishaw	Ben Whishaw	Ben Whishaw
Sylvia Trench	Eunice Gayson	Eunice Gayson																							
Felix Leiter	Jack Lord		Cec Linder	Rik Van Nutter			Norman Burton	David Hedison							John Terry	David Hedison					Jeffrey Wright	Jeffrey Wright			Jeffrey Wright
Ernst Stavro Blofeld		Anthony Dawson		Anthony Dawson	Donald Pleasence	Telly Savalas	Charles Gray (actor)					John Hollis												Christoph Waltz	Christoph Waltz
J. W. Pepper								Clifton James	Clifton James																
Bill Tanner										Michael Goodliffe			James Villiers					Michael Kitchen		Michael Kitchen			Rory Kinnear	Rory Kinnear	Rory Kinnear
Frederick Gray										Geoffrey Keen	Geoffrey Keen	Geoffrey Keen	Geoffrey Keen	Geoffrey Keen	Geoffrey Keen										
General Gogol										Walter Gotell	Walter Gotell	Walter Gotell	Walter Gotell	Walter Gotell	Walter Gotell										
Jaws										Richard Kiel	Richard Kiel														
Rublevitch										Eva Rueber-Staier		Eva Rueber-Staier	Eva Rueber-Staier		Virginia Hey										
Smithers												Jeremy Bulloch	Jeremy Bulloch												
Jack Wade																	Joe Don Baker	Joe Don Baker							
Valentin Zukovsky																	Robbie Coltrane		Robbie Coltrane						
Charles Robinson																		Colin Salmon	Colin Salmon	Colin Salmon					
Mr. White																					Jesper Christensen	Jesper Christensen		Jesper Christensen	
René Mathis																					Giancarlo Giannini	Giancarlo Giannini			
Madeleine Swann																								Léa Seydoux	Léa Seydoux
Vogel																								Brigitte Millar	Brigitte Millar
	01	02	03	04	05	06	07	08	09	10	11	12	13	14	15	16	17	18	19	20	21	22	23	24	25

== See also ==
- Ian Fleming – Author of the James Bond novel series
- Pinewood Studios – physical location for sets and props for the James Bond films when not filming on location
- List of actors considered for the James Bond character
- Outline of James Bond
