= John Flynn (director) =

American film director (1932–2007)

- Born: March 14, 1932; Chicago, Illinois, US
- Died: April 4, 2007 (aged 75); Pacific Palisades, California, US
- Education: University of California, Los Angeles
- Occupations: Film director, screenwriter
- Years active: 1961–2001

John Flynn (March 14, 1932 – April 4, 2007) was an American film director, known for the taut and gritty style he brought to various crime, thriller, and action films. His best known works include The Outfit (1973), Rolling Thunder (1977), Best Seller (1987), Lock Up (1989), and Out for Justice (1991).

== Early life and education ==
Flynn was born in Chicago and raised in Hermosa Beach, California. He served in the Coast Guard, and studied journalism at the University of California, Los Angeles, where one of his teachers was Alex Haley.

== Career ==
=== Assistant ===
Flynn entered the film industry when Robert Wise hired him to do some research for a biopic of Robert Capa. The film never was made, but he got along with Wise who hired Flynn to work as his assistant on Odds Against Tomorrow, and later as a script supervisor on West Side Story.

Flynn subsequently worked as a second assistant director on Kid Galahad and Two for the Seesaw. He then worked as first assistant director on The Great Escape and second unit director on Kings of the Sun ("a bullshit script, a popcorn script", according to Flynn). This was directed by J. Lee Thompson, who again used Flynn as an assistant director on What a Way to Go! and John Goldfarb, Please Come Home!.

=== Film director ===
In 1966, Wise set up a company to produce low-budget films that others would direct. He optioned Dennis Murphy's novel The Sergeant and hired Flynn to direct. The movie starred Rod Steiger. Though a critical and commercial disappointment on initial release, it has been noted in the years since for its frank depiction of queer themes.

Flynn's next movie, The Jerusalem File was shot in Israel. It did not perform well at the box office.

Following this, he directed the Donald E. Westlake adaptation The Outfit (1973), starring Robert Duvall and Joe Don Baker. It was both a critical and commercial success, and was praised by Westlake himself as the most faithful adaptation of his Parker novels.

Flynn achieved a dedicated cult following with the 1977 gritty revenge thriller Rolling Thunder starring William Devane and Tommy Lee Jones. The film was highly controversial because of its violence. In a 1994 interview with Jon Stewart, filmmaker Quentin Tarantino cited Rolling Thunder as an influence and Flynn among his favorite directors. The film received praise for its action sequences, atmosphere, direction, music and cast performances; however, it was criticized for its pace and violent climax. In addition to its critical success, the film was also a box-office success with an estimated revenue of $130 million against its $5 million production budget.

Flynn made a number of higher-profile films in the late 1980s, including the James Woods neo-noir Best Seller, the Sylvester Stallone prison drama Lock Up, and the Steven Seagal action film Out for Justice.

In the early 1990s, Flynn directed two made-for-cable-TV films: the Dennis Hopper cop film Nails and the crime drama Scam. In 1994, he directed Brainscan, a sci-fi horror film about virtual reality, starring Edward Furlong and Frank Langella. His last film was the direct-to-video film Protection (2001), with Stephen Baldwin and Peter Gallagher.

== Personal life ==
He spent the last few years of his life mostly in France.

=== Death ===
Flynn died in his sleep on April 4, 2007 at his Los Angeles home. He was survived by his son Tara.

== Filmography ==
=== Theatrical films ===
| Year | Title | Notes |
|---|---|---|
| 1968 | The Sergeant | |
| 1972 | The Jerusalem File | |
| 1973 | The Outfit | Also screenwriter |
| 1977 | Rolling Thunder | |
| 1980 | Defiance | |
| 1983 | Touched | |
| 1987 | Best Seller | |
| 1989 | Lock Up | |
| 1991 | Out for Justice | |
| 1994 | Brainscan | |
| 2001 | Protection | |

Ref.:

=== TV movies ===
| Year | Title | Notes |
|---|---|---|
| 1980 | Marilyn: The Untold Story | |
| 1983 | Lone Star | Also screenwriter Unsold pilot |
| 1992 | Nails | |
| 1993 | Scam | |
| 1999 | Absence of the Good | |

== Unrealized projects ==
- On the Day of His Death, from a short novel by Polish writer Marek Hłasko about immigrants in Israel - Flynn had wanted to make it since the 1960s.
- A police procedural drama set in Paris "in the spirit of Le Samouraï.
