= Brad Whitaker =

- James Bond character
- Baker as Brad Whitaker
- Portrayed by: Joe Don Baker

In-universe information
- Occupation: Black market arms dealer
- Affiliation: General Georgi Koskov
- Classification: Villain
- Henchmen: Necros; Sergeant Stagg

Brad Whitaker is a fictional character in the James Bond film The Living Daylights. He was portrayed by American actor Joe Don Baker. Baker also appeared as Jack Wade, Bond's CIA contact, in Pierce Brosnan's first two Bond films, GoldenEye and Tomorrow Never Dies. Steven Rubin describes Whitaker as a "smarmy bad-guy arms trader."

== Background ==
Brad Whitaker (Joe Don Baker) is an international black market arms dealer. He is fascinated by war, but has no actual military experience, so he turns to arms dealing to organize his own personal military force. Expelled from West Point for cheating, he spends a short stint as a mercenary in the Belgian Congo before starting to work with various other criminal organisations that would help organise his very first arms deals. He loves military history and it is implied that he wargames various historical conflicts using automated miniature figures and effects, such as the battles of Agincourt, Waterloo, and Gettysburg. In a conversation with James Bond (Timothy Dalton) during their confrontation, Whitaker says that he believes that Pickett's Charge should have been made up Little Round Top and that, if Ulysses S. Grant had been in charge of the Union at Gettysburg, he would have crushed the Army of Northern Virginia, thus ending the rebellion. He says "Meade should have taken another 35,000 casualties. Could've ended the rebellion right then and there. Hell, Grant would've done it!".

Whitaker has a personal pantheon of "great military commanders" in his headquarters, which includes some of history's most famous and infamous figures, such as Adolf Hitler, Napoleon Bonaparte, Genghis Khan, Julius Caesar, Alexander the Great, Oliver Cromwell, and Attila the Hun. Whitaker holds these men in high regard and calls them "surgeons who removed society's dead flesh". All representations of these "surgeons" (or "butchers" as Bond's ally, Leonid Pushkin (John Rhys-Davies), describes them) are sculpted to resemble Whitaker himself, which is highly noticeable when Whitaker hides among the statues waiting for Pushkin to visit him.

== In the film ==
Brad Whitaker joins forces with rogue Soviet General Georgi Koskov (Jeroen Krabbé) to secure a large shipment of opium from the Snow Leopard Brotherhood in Afghanistan for $500,000,000 worth of diamonds that he had obtained from an arms deal with the Soviets. Once the opium is sold, Whitaker will have enough money to continue arms deals far into the future. At the same time, they attempt to use James Bond and MI6 to eliminate General Anatol Gogol (Walter Gotell)'s replacement as the new Soviet head of secret operations, General Pushkin, on the basis that he has re-instituted an ongoing operation called "Smiert Spionom" (meaning "Death to Spies" in Russian). Actually, it is Koskov and Whitaker's men, especially their special henchman Necros (Andreas Wisniewski), who are involved in killing the British agents.

After thwarting Whitaker's plans in Afghanistan, Bond returns to Tangier to hunt him down at his headquarters, a plan which evolves into a game of cat-and-mouse in Whitaker's gaming room, with him using high-tech weapons, such as an 80-round light machine gun rifle with an integral ballistic shield, a bulletproof vest and a loaded antique battlefield cannon, while Bond has only his 8-round Walther PPK.

After Bond hides behind a bust of the Duke of Wellington, he primes his key-ring finder behind it; and when Whitaker gets right in front of it, Bond activates it. Triggered by Bond's wolf whistle, the key-ring finder explodes, toppling the bust and podium on top of Whitaker, crushing him through a glass display case containing one of his miniature diorama setups resembling Waterloo, which makes Bond ironically quip to Pushkin, "He met his Waterloo."

== Reception ==
Steven Rubin describes Whitaker as a "smarmy bad-guy arms trader". Jeremy Black says of him; a "mad American pseudo-general, Brad Whitaker, the arms dealer, yet another figure with a Napoleon complex." Baker himself called his character "a nut" who "thought he was Napoleon." Paul Simpson describes Whitaker as "paunchy", and says that it is fortunate that he doesn't get much screen time. Lee Pfeiffer and Dave Worrall say of him, "this egotistical US arms dealer models himself on history's most notorious dictators. In between orchestrating international arms deals, Whitaker enjoys re-creating battles with his vast dioramas and toy soldiers." They believe that Joe Don Baker, although amusing, was miscast in the role as Whitaker. They also criticized his believability as a villain, describing him as an "oaf" from the American South who nobody would doubt could easily be defeated by James Bond.
