= Necros (James Bond) =

Fictional character from the film The Living Daylights

- James Bond character
- Andreas Wisniewski as Necros
- Portrayed by: Andreas Wisniewski

In-universe information
- Gender: Male
- Affiliation: General Georgi Koskov; Brad Whitaker
- Classification: Henchman

Necros is a fictional character and henchman in the 1987 James Bond film The Living Daylights. He was played by Andreas Wisniewski. Tall, muscular, blond, blue-eyed and steel-jawed Necros is of the Red Grant model (as portrayed by Robert Shaw in the 1963 film From Russia with Love), common in the earlier James Bond films. Over the course of the film, Necros impersonates an American jogger, a Cockney milkman, an upper-class-sounding MI6 Agent, an Austrian balloon salesman, and a doctor in Morocco.

== Biography ==
Necros (Andreas Wisniewski), meaning 'dead' in Greek, was General Georgi Koskov (Jeroen Krabbé)'s highly trained and disciplined Soviet assassin with KGB affiliations, but ultimately loyal to Koskov. He also says he has comrades fighting for "world revolution". His personal stereo plays The Pretenders. Necros uses a great number of disguises and many techniques of killing, although strangulation seems to be a preferred method.

Necros' first priority is to see that Koskov is brought safely to Brad Whitaker (Joe Don Baker)'s Tangier estate from the safe house in England, where Koskov is being held by British Intelligence. He completes this mission by disguising himself as a milkman, whereby he gains access to the intelligence compound. Subsequently, he radios in a report of a major gas leak within the building. This causes security to order an immediate evacuation. In the confusion, he abducts Koskov and effects his escape with the help of explosive milk bottles that look like molotovs, killing several Secret Service agents who attempt to apprehend him.

Necros later kills Saunders (Thomas Wheatley), head of Station V in Vienna, disguised as a balloon salesman, by setting a bomb to explode at the doors to the cafe as he leaves his rendezvous with James Bond (Timothy Dalton). The killing becomes part of the operation to make the British Secret Service believe the Soviets have instituted a "Smiert Spionem" or "Death to Spies" operation.

Necros himself is killed after a midair struggle with Bond on the holding net of a Lockheed C-130 Hercules cargo plane 6,500 feet (2,000 m) above Afghanistan. Necros pleads for his life whilst hanging on to Bond's boot, but Bond slips the boot off by cutting the laces and drops the henchman to his death.

== Reception ==
Perhaps due to his imposing stature and chiseled features, variety of false accents and love of pop music, Sally Hibbin considers Necros to be one of the most memorable Bond villains. However, Steven Rubin stated that he was "not on-screen long enough to make any true impact", although he added that "even he has his sympathetic moments." Lee Pfeiffer and Dave Worrall say of Necros, "Necros is the most intriguing of the film's trio of main villains. He is a silent, humourless, but extremely handsome assassin who tends to use a Walkman as a strangulation device. The role is well played by Andreas Wisniewski, who provides the film with a much-needed sense of menace."

== See also ==
- List of James Bond villains
