= Nails (1992 film) =

- Genre: Action; Crime; Drama
- Written by: Larry Ferguson
- Directed by: John Flynn
- Starring: Dennis Hopper; Anne Archer
- Music by: Bill Conti
- Country of origin: United States
- Original language: English

Production
- Executive producer: Dale Rosenbloom
- Producer: George W. Perkins
- Production locations: 646 S Main St, Downtown, Los Angeles
- Cinematography: Mac Ahlberg
- Running time: 96 minutes
- Production companies: Empress Productions Inc. Viacom Pictures

Original release
- Network: Showtime
- Release: July 25, 1992

Nails is a 1992 American crime drama film directed by John Flynn, written by Larry Ferguson, and starring Dennis Hopper. It was made for Showtime but released theatrically in Europe.

== Plot ==
Hard boiled LA officer Harry "Nails" Niles and his partner are ambushed. Nile's partner is killed and he is determined to track down the culprits even if it means bending the rules and butting heads with his more traditional superiors. His investigation reveals a wide ranging conspiracy involving drugs and a Congressman.

== Cast ==
- Dennis Hopper as Harry "Nails" Niles
- Anne Archer as Mary Niles
- Tomas Milian as Pedro Herrera
- Keith David as Noah Owens
- Carlos Carrasco as Jose Acosta
- Charles Hallahan as Bud Taylor
- Jay Acovone as Captain Evan Graham
- Earl Billings as Jack Willis
- Cliff DeYoung as Stambusky
- Luis Antonio Ramos as Ricardo Sanchez
- Raymond Cruz as Paco Sanchez
- Juan Fernández as Victor Menandez
- Teresa Crespo as Elena Hernandez
- Brian Markinson as Calley
- John Hawkes as Harvey Cassler
- Danny Trejo as Las Virgenes Bartender
- Martha Veléz as Rosa Herrera
