= Scam (film) =

1993 American television film

- VHS Artwork
- Genre: Crime; Drama
- Based on: Ladystinger by Craig Smith
- Written by: Craig Smith
- Directed by: John Flynn
- Starring: Christopher Walken; Lorraine Bracco; Miguel Ferrar; Martin Donovan
- Theme music composer: Stephen Graziano
- Country of origin: United States
- Original language: English

Production
- Executive producer: Frederick Schneier
- Producer: David Lancaster
- Cinematography: Ric Waite
- Editor: Michael N. Knue
- Running time: 102 minutes

Original release
- Release: May 22, 1993

Scam (released theatrically in the Philippines as Restless Heart) is a 1993 television film adaptation of crime drama novel by Craig Smith titled Ladystinger. It originally aired on Showtime in May 1993.

== Plot ==
Maggie Rohrer (Lorraine Bracco) is a seductive con-artist scamming the rich in Miami Beach. When she picks the wrong mark, Jack Shanks (Christopher Walken), he blackmails her into working with him on the ultimate scam in Jamaica. He wants to use her talents in a much bigger scam: ripping off a crime lord by getting at his programmer's computer files. But she starts to have doubts about what he's really after when she finds a huge stash of loot with the disks. He claims no knowledge of the money, she distrusts him, he's using her, things start getting dangerous and even murderous - and then her boyfriend shows up. When the scam turns deadly, murder and double-cross become the only way to finish their dangerous game.

== Cast ==
Actor/Actress	Role
Christopher Walken	Jack Shanks
Lorraine Bracco	Maggie Rohrer
Miguel Ferrer	Barry Landers
Martin Donovan	Gordon Wexler
James McDaniel	Daniel Poole
Daniel von Bargen	Albert Magliocco
Eric Avari	Mr. Ayub

== Production ==
John Flynn says he was offered the film by Showtime on the basis of his work for them on Nails (1992). The movie was shot in Jamaica. Flynn:

It was a privilege to work with Chris Walken. What a fine actor he is. Miguel Ferrer and Martin Donovan are also first-rate talents, but Lorraine Bracco was clinically depressed at the time, having trouble with her boyfriend Edward James Olmos and her ex-husband Harvey Keitel. So Lorraine wasn't at the top of her game in Scam.

== Release ==
Scam was first aired on Showtime in the United States on May 22, 1993. In the Philippines, the film was released in theaters as Restless Heart by Golden Films on July 6, 1994.
