= The Sergeant (1968 film) =

1968 film by John Flynn

- Directed by: John Flynn
- Screenplay by: Dennis Murphy
- Based on: The Sergeant (1958 novel) by Dennis Murphy
- Produced by: Richard Goldstone
- Starring: Rod Steiger; John Phillip Law; Ludmila Mikaël
- Cinematography: Henri Persin
- Edited by: Françoise Diot
- Music by: Michel Magne
- Production company: Robert Wise Productions
- Distributed by: Warner Bros.-Seven Arts
- Release dates: October 24, 1968 (San Francisco); December 25, 1968 (U.S.)
- Running time: 108 minutes
- Country: United States
- Language: English
- Box office: $1.2 million (U.S./Canada rentals)

The Sergeant is a 1968 American drama film directed by John Flynn in his directorial debut, and starring Rod Steiger, John Phillip Law, and Ludmila Mikaël. The screenplay by Dennis Murphy is based on his 1958 novel. The film is about a decorated US Army war veteran (Steiger), whose disciplined life is disrupted by his repressed homosexuality towards one of his subordinates (Law).

The film is notable for its frank depiction of queer themes. The Sergeant premiered at the San Francisco International Film Festival, and was released by Warner Bros.-Seven Arts on Christmas Day 1968.

== Plot ==
A dedicated, decorated war veteran, Master Sergeant Callan, is posted in France at a fuel supply depot in 1952. Finding a lack of discipline under the frequently drunk Capt. Loring, he takes charge in a tough, no-nonsense manner.

But distracting the sergeant is a physical attraction to one of his men, Private First Class Thomas Swanson, that seems at odds with everything in Callan's personality. He makes Swanson his orderly and befriends him socially, but behind his back scares off Solange, the private's girlfriend.

Callan's confusion and depression grows and he begins to drink. Unable to resist the urge, the sergeant attempts to kiss Swanson and is violently warded off. He turns up for morning formation hungover and Loring relieves him of duty. Callan goes off to a nearby woods alone, rifle in hand, and commits suicide.

== Cast ==
Credits from the AFI Catalog of Feature Films:

- Rod Steiger as MSGT. Albert Callan
- John Phillip Law as PFC. Tom Swanson
- Ludmila Mikaël as Solange
- Frank Latimore as CPT. Loring
- Elliott Sullivan as "Pop" Henneken
- Ronald Rubin as CPL. Cowley
- Philip Roye as Aldous Brown
- Jerry Brouer as SGT. Komski
- Memphis Slim as Nightclub Singer

== Production ==
In 1966, Robert Wise set up a company to produce low-budget films that others would direct. He optioned Dennis Murphy's novel The Sergeant and hired his former assistant, John Flynn, to direct. Flynn says Simon Oakland badly wanted to play the lead, but so did Rod Steiger, who was in much demand at the time, and Steiger played it for less than his usual fee.

Filming took place in Jouars-Pontchartrain and Paris, France.

== Reception ==
On review aggregator website Rotten Tomatoes, the film has a 20% approval rank based on 5 reviews.

Vito Russo, activist and film historian, examined the film in The Celluloid Closet: " ... Joe Flynn's screen version of Dennis Murphy's The Sergeant dealt with the fate of repressed homosexuals who were at odds with the super-macho ethic of military life ... So careful is The Sergeant, however, that it offers two hours of imagined foreplay, culminating in a sloppy kiss and tragedy. Sergeant Callan is a homosexual Marty, his hands in his pockets, always hanging out with the straight guys, secretly in love with them ... When in the film's anticlimax he finally kisses the nonplussed Private Swanson, there is no culminating passion, but rage and hatred for what the kiss represents." Film historian Richard Barrios wrote, " ... The Sergeant proved to be the axis of a bemusing paradox. It was sufficiently frank to have not been filmable earlier, yet is seemed unhip, in fact, old-fashioned ... the bipolar disorder of tolerance vs. morality cast a heavy pall ... Scarcely fifteen minutes had elapsed when it was clear to the audience who Callan was and where it was all headed." Leslie Halliwell, British film critic, wrote, "Well-made but very ponderous and limited melodrama which could have been told in half the time." Leonard Maltin gave the film two of four stars: "Predictable drama ... Director Flynn has nice eye for detail, but overall, film doesn't make much of an impression." Vincent Canby of The New York Times called The Sergeant a "worth seeing [film]", adding to it that "even when you're running ahead of it, anticipating its crises and climaxes as if they were stops on the BMT".

=== Awards and nominations ===
Steiger won the 1969 David di Donatello for Best Foreign Actor for his performance.

== Legacy ==
The film was excerpted in the documentary film The Celluloid Closet (1996).

== See also ==
- List of American films of 1968
- Reflections in a Golden Eye (1967)
