= Mongo's Back in Town =

- Video cover, shown under its alternate title, Steel Wreath.
- Written by: E. Richard Johnson; Herman Miller
- Directed by: Marvin J. Chomsky
- Starring: Telly Savalas; Joe Don Baker
- Country of origin: United States

Production
- Running time: 73 minutes
- Production company: Bob Banner Associates

Original release
- Network: CBS
- Release: December 10, 1971

Mongo's Back in Town is a 1971 crime made-for-television film, directed by Marvin J. Chomsky, with Telly Savalas, Joe Don Baker and Martin Sheen. It was released in some regions under the title Steel Wreath.

== Plot ==
Telly Savalas plays the role of police Lieutenant Pete Tolstad, a role very similar to his later title role on his TV series Kojak. Joe Don Baker is Mongo Nash, a professional killer hired by his brother, a gang boss, to wipe out a rival gangster, and the hit man is the one Tolstad must stop.

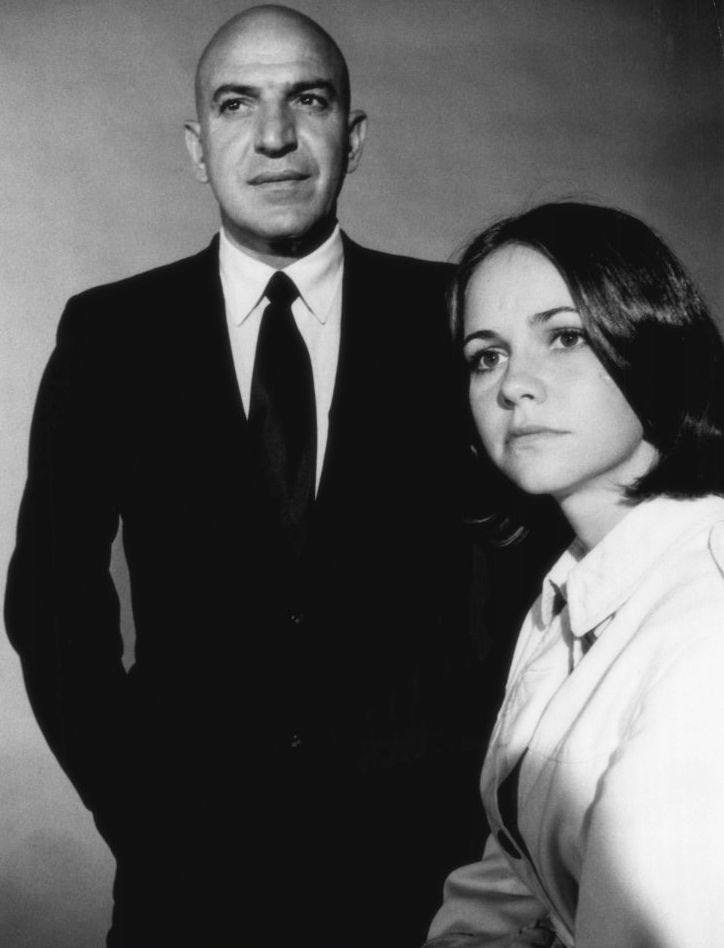
Telly Savalas and Sally Field

== Cast ==
Actor	Role
Telly Savalas	Lieutenant Pete Tolstad
Joe Don Baker	Mongo Nash
Martin Sheen	Gordon
Anne Francis	Angel
Sally Field	Vikki
Charles Cioffi	Mike Nash
Johnny Haymer	Rocca
Howard Dayton	Blind man
