= Protection (2001 film) =

2001 American film by John Flynn

- Directed by: John Flynn
- Written by: Jack Kelly
- Produced by: Lee Faulkner
- Starring: Stephen Baldwin; Peter Gallagher
- Cinematography: Marc Charlebois
- Edited by: Robert E. Newton
- Music by: Richard Marvin
- Production company: Faulkner-Bibo Productions; Le Monde Entertainment
- Distributed by: New Concorde (U.S.); Alliance Atlantis (Canada)
- Release date: October 28, 2001 (Turkey)
- Running time: 96 minutes
- Country: United States; Canada
- Language: English
- Box office: $666

Protection is a 2001 crime thriller film directed by John Flynn, and starring Stephen Baldwin and Peter Gallagher. It was Flynn's last film before his death in 2007.

== Plot ==
Mobster Salvatore Veronica enters the Federal Witness Protection Program. With his family, he begins a new life in a new town, but is unable to escape the shadow of his past.

== Cast ==
- Stephen Baldwin as Sal Vincent / Salvatore Veronica
- Peter Gallagher as Ted
- Aron Tager as Lujak
- Katie Griffin as Gina
- Deborah Odell as Laura
- Vlasta Vrana as Shimanski
- Gary Fine as Mario
- Brennan Delaney as Josh
- Carlo Berardinucci as Joey
- Amy Sobol as Jenny
- Mark Camacho as Peter
- Manuel Aránguiz as Ramos
- Harry Standjofski as Angelo
