= The Living Daylights =

1987 James Bond film

- Theatrical release poster by Brian Bysouth
- Directed by: John Glen
- Screenplay by: Richard Maibaum; Michael G. Wilson
- Based on: "The Living Daylights"; 1966 novel by Ian Fleming
- Produced by: Albert R. Broccoli; Michael G. Wilson
- Starring: Timothy Dalton; Maryam d'Abo; Joe Don Baker; Art Malik; Jeroen Krabbé
- Cinematography: Alec Mills
- Edited by: John Grover; Peter Davies
- Music by: John Barry
- Production companies: United Artists; Eon Productions Limited
- Distributed by: MGM/UA Communications Co. (United States); United International Pictures (International)
- Release dates: 29 June 1987 (London, premiere); 30 June 1987 (UK); 31 July 1987 (US)
- Running time: 131 minutes
- Country: United Kingdom; United States
- Language: English
- Budget: $40 million
- Box office: $191.2 million

The Living Daylights is a 1987 spy film, the fifteenth entry in the James Bond series produced by Eon Productions, and the first of two to star Timothy Dalton as the fictional MI6 agent James Bond. It also stars Maryam d'Abo, Joe Don Baker, Jeroen Krabbé, Art Malik and John Rhys-Davies in supporting roles. In the film, Bond uncovers a plot by a rogue Soviet general and an American arms dealer who fake a defection to fund a drug and weapon scheme. Bond teams up with the general's cellist girlfriend to expose and stop the operation.

The fourth film in the series to be directed by John Glen, the film's title is taken from Ian Fleming's short story "The Living Daylights", the plot of which also forms the basis of the first act of the film. It was the last film to use the title of an Ian Fleming story until the 2006 instalment Casino Royale. It is also the first film to have Caroline Bliss as Miss Moneypenny, replacing Lois Maxwell.

The Living Daylights was produced by Albert R. Broccoli, his stepson Michael G. Wilson, and co-produced by his daughter, Barbara Broccoli. Following Roger Moore's decision to leave the series after A View to a Kill, Dalton was cast after an extensive search that saw the producers almost cast Pierce Brosnan, who would later portray Bond starting with GoldenEye (1995). Dalton approached the character differently from Moore, wanting to be more faithful to Fleming's original character. Filming took place in various locations, including the United Kingdom, Austria and Morocco. The Living Daylights was the final Bond film to be scored by composer John Barry, while the title song was performed by the Norwegian group A-ha.

The film was a commercial success, grossing $191.2 million worldwide. It initially received mixed critical reviews, with Dalton's performance drawing both praise and criticism. Retrospective reviews have been more positive, with many critics praising The Living Daylights as one of the best Bond films, although some have criticised its portrayal of the mujahideen. It was followed by Licence to Kill in 1989.

== Plot ==
James Bond, alongside fellow MI6 agents 004 and 002, participates in a training exercise in Gibraltar. During the exercise, an assassin kills 004 and several British military personnel. Bond chases down the assassin, who dies after a vehicle chase.

Bond is assigned to help KGB General Georgi Koskov defect to the West, acting as a counter-sniper covering his escape from a concert hall in Bratislava, Czechoslovakia. Bond notices that the KGB sniper assigned to protect Koskov is a female cellist from the orchestra. Disobeying his orders to kill the sniper, he shoots the rifle from the cellist, then uses the Trans-Siberian Pipeline to smuggle Koskov to the West.

In his post-defection debriefing, Koskov informs MI6 that the KGB's policy of Smert Shpionam, meaning "Death to Spies", has been reactivated by General Leonid Pushkin, the new head of the KGB. Koskov is later abducted from the Blayden estate safe-house and is assumed to have been taken back to Moscow. Bond is ordered to track down Pushkin in Tangier and kill him, to stop further killings of agents and escalation of tensions between the Soviet Union and the West. Bond agrees to carry out the mission when he learns that the assassin who killed 004 left a note reading "Smiert Spionam".

Bond returns to Bratislava to track down the cellist, Kara Milovy. He finds out that Koskov's defection was faked; Kara is Koskov's girlfriend. Bond convinces Kara that he is a friend of Koskov's and persuades her to accompany him to Vienna to be reunited with him. They escape Bratislava while being pursued by the KGB and Slovak police, crossing over the border into Austria. Pushkin meets with arms dealer Brad Whitaker in Tangier, informing him that the KGB is cancelling an arms deal previously arranged between Koskov and Whitaker.

During his brief journey with Kara in Vienna, Bond visits the Wurstelprater to meet MI6 ally Saunders, who discovers a history of financial dealings between Koskov and Whitaker. As he leaves their meeting, Saunders is killed by Koskov's henchman Necros, who leaves the message Smert' Shpionam. Bond and Kara leave for Tangier, where Bond confronts Pushkin, who denies any knowledge of Smert' Shpionam and reveals that Koskov is evading arrest for embezzlement of government funds. Bond and Pushkin join forces, and Bond fakes Pushkin's assassination, causing Whitaker and Koskov to progress with their scheme. Kara contacts Koskov, who tells her that Bond is actually a KGB agent and convinces her to drug him so that he can be captured.

Koskov, Necros, Kara, and the drugged Bond fly to a Soviet air base in Afghanistan, where Koskov imprisons Kara alongside Bond. The pair escape and free a condemned prisoner, Kamran Shah, leader of the local Mujahideen. Bond and Kara discover that Koskov is using Soviet diamonds to buy a massive shipment of opium from the Mujahideen, intending to keep the profits with enough left over to supply the Soviets with their arms and buy Western arms from Whitaker.

With the Mujahideen's help, Bond plants a bomb aboard the cargo plane carrying the opium but is discovered and barricades himself in the plane. The Mujahideen attack the air base on horseback and engage the Soviets in a gun battle. Kara drives a jeep into the cargo hold of the plane as Bond takes off, and Necros jumps on board at the last second. After a fight, Bond sends Necros falling to his death and deactivates the bomb. Bond then notices Shah and his men being pursued by Soviet forces. He re-activates the bomb and drops it out of the plane and onto a bridge, blowing it up and helping Shah and his men escape the Soviets. The plane crashes, destroying the drugs; Bond and Kara escape.

Bond returns to Tangier to kill Whitaker, infiltrating his estate with the help of Felix Leiter. Pushkin arrests Koskov, ordering him to be sent back to Moscow "in the diplomatic bag".

Sometime later, Kara is the solo cellist in a Vienna performance. Kamran Shah and his men jostle in during the intermission and are introduced to now-diplomat General Gogol, Pushkin's predecessor at the KGB. After her performance, Bond surprises Kara in her dressing room, and they embrace.

== Cast ==
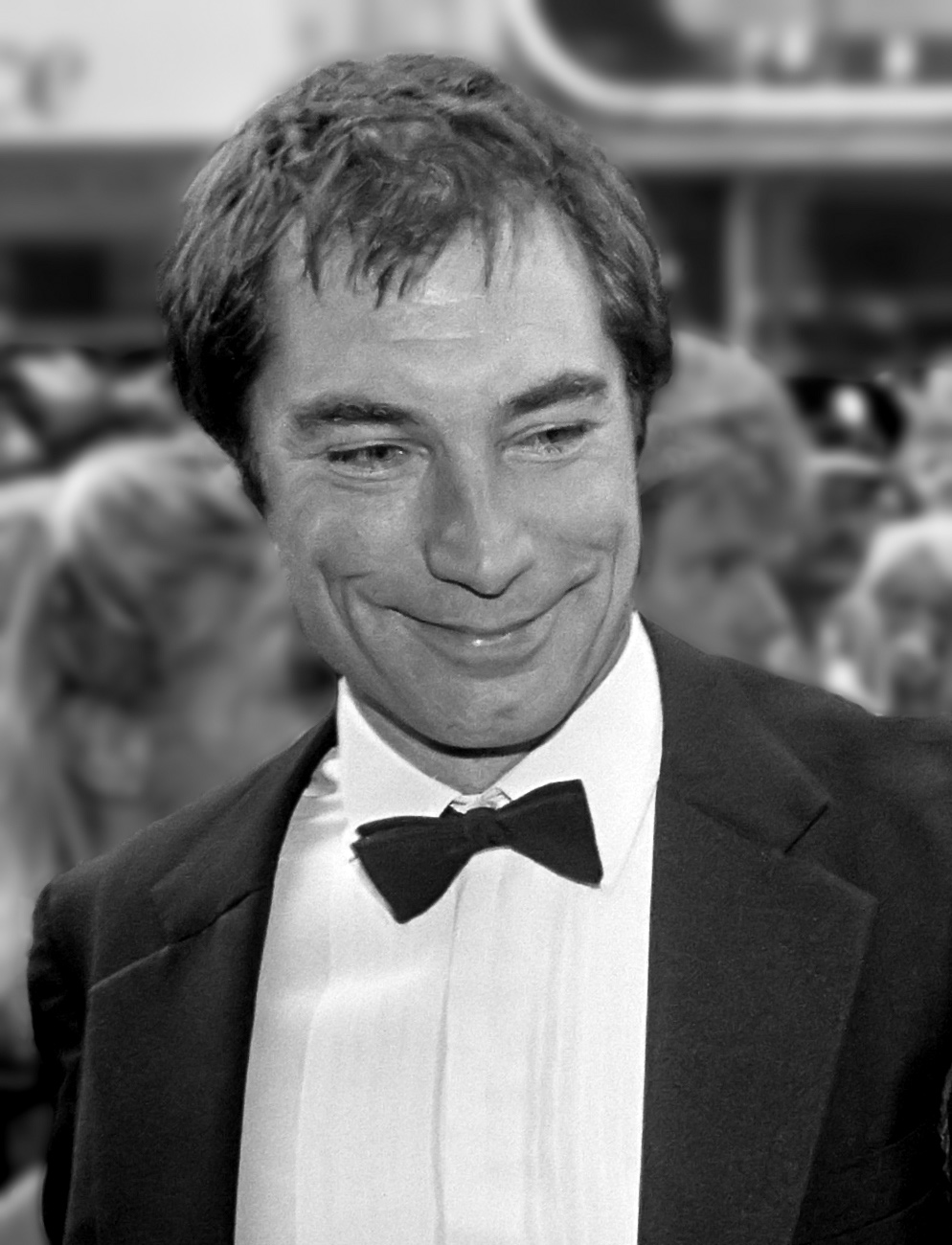
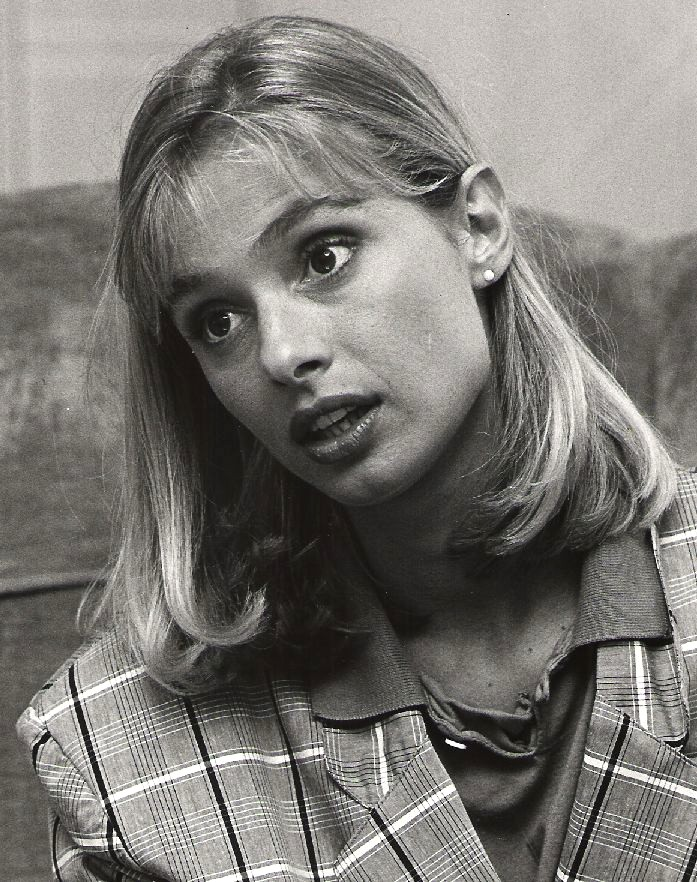
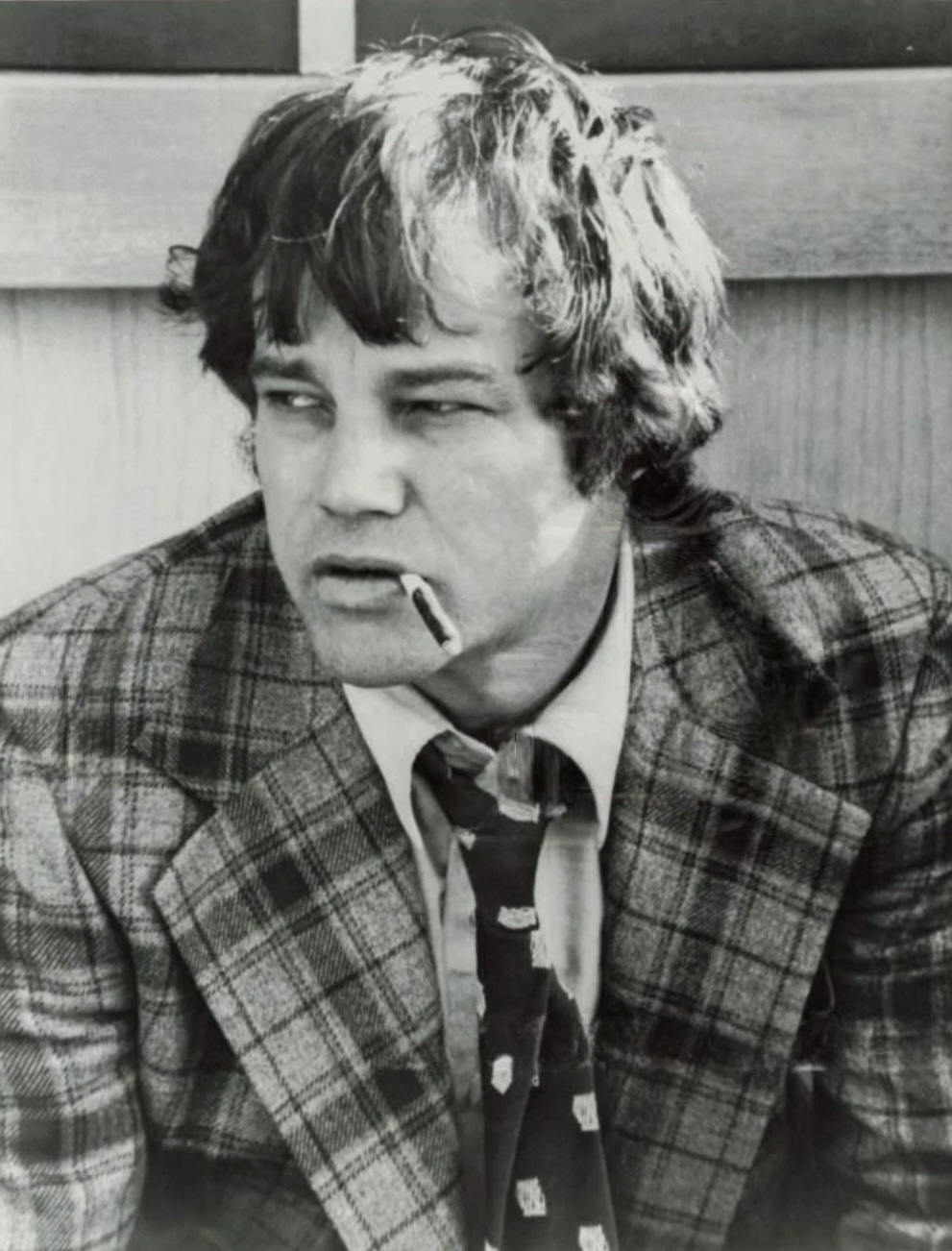
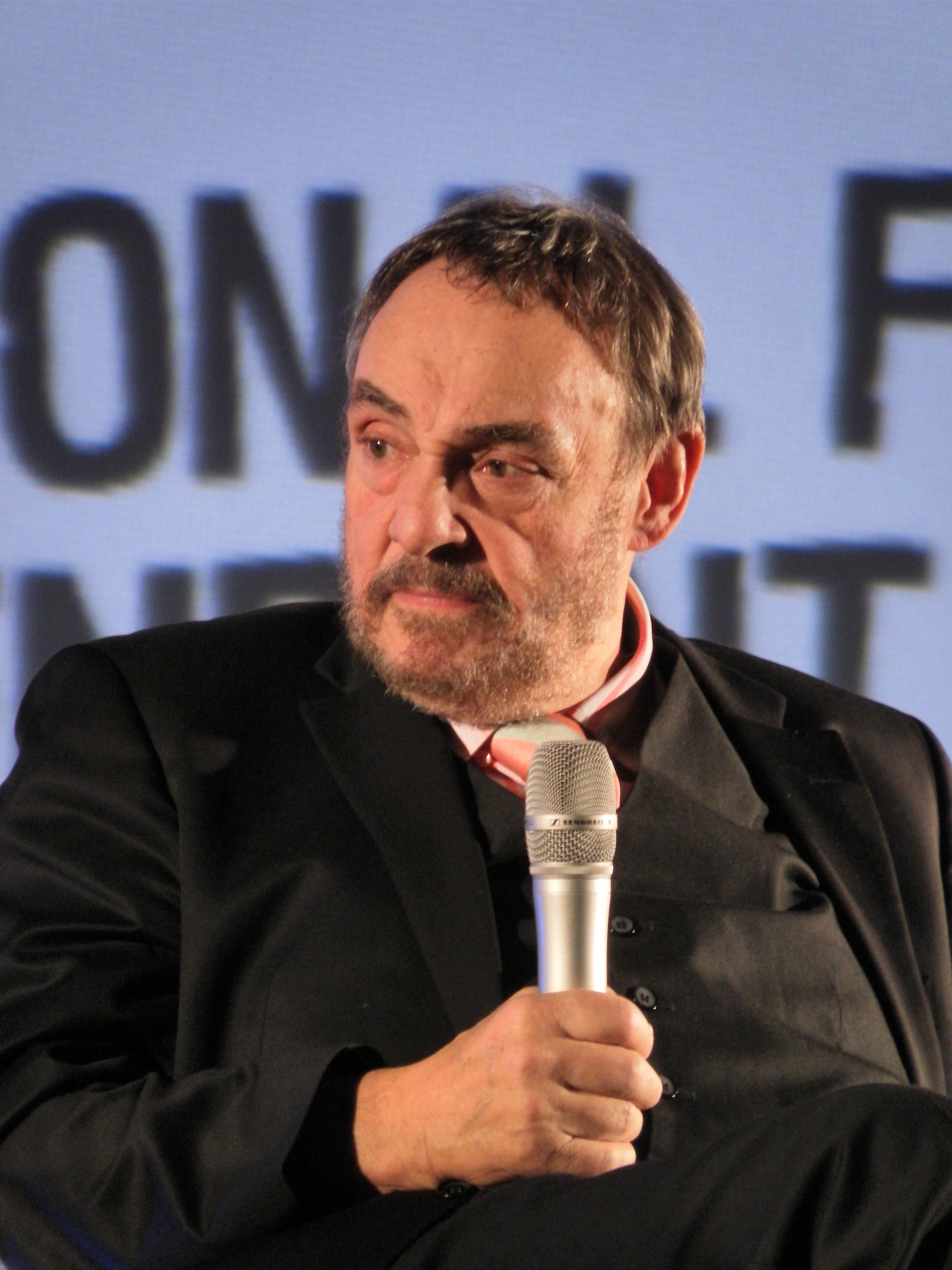
Timothy Dalton (far left), Maryam d'Abo (both in 1987), Joe Don Baker in 1958 and John Rhys-Davies in 2013
- Timothy Dalton as James Bond 007, an MI6 agent assigned to look into the deaths of several KGB defectors and conspiracies against several of his allies
- Maryam d'Abo as Kara Milovy, Koskov's girlfriend and later Bond's love interest
- Joe Don Baker as Brad Whitaker, an American arms dealer and self-styled general, who serves as Koskov's primary ally. Baker called his character "a nut" who "thought he was Napoleon". Baker later appeared in the franchise as CIA agent Jack Wade in GoldenEye (1995) and Tomorrow Never Dies (1997).
- Art Malik as Kamran Shah, a leader in the Afghan mujahideen
- John Rhys-Davies as General Leonid Pushkin, the new head of the KGB, replacing General Gogol
- Jeroen Krabbé as General Georgi Koskov, a renegade Soviet general who attempts to manipulate the British government into assassinating his rival, General Pushkin
- Andreas Wisniewski as Necros, Koskov's henchman, who poses repeated threats to Bond. His voice was dubbed by an uncredited Kerry Shale.
- Thomas Wheatley as Saunders, head of MI6 Section V (Vienna), Bond's ally
- Julie T. Wallace as Rosika Miklos, Bond's contact in Bratislava, Czechoslovakia, who works at the TransSiberian Pipeline.
- Desmond Llewelyn as Q, MI6's "quartermaster", who supplies Bond with multi-purpose vehicles and gadgets useful in the latter's mission
- Robert Brown as M, the head of MI6 and Bond's superior
- Walter Gotell as Anatol Gogol, the retired head of the KGB, now a diplomat shown in a cameo at the end of the film
- Caroline Bliss as Miss Moneypenny, M's secretary
- Geoffrey Keen as Frederick Gray (credited as Minister of Defence), the British Minister of Defence
- Virginia Hey as Rubavitch, General Leonid Pushkin's mistress in Morocco
- John Terry as Felix Leiter, a CIA agent and ally to Bond
- Nadim Sawalha as the Tangier police chief. Sawalha also appeared as Aziz Fekkesh in a previous Bond film, The Spy Who Loved Me (1977).
- John Bowe as Colonel Feyador, the leader of the Soviet air base in Afghanistan.
- Belle Avery as Linda, a woman Bond meets in the pre-credits sequence. Her voice was dubbed by an uncredited Nikki van der Zyl.
- Catherine Rabett as Liz, a CIA agent
- Dulice Liecier as Ava, a CIA agent
- Alan Talbot as Koskov's KGB minder

Composer John Barry makes an uncredited cameo appearance as an orchestra conductor.

== Production ==
Originally the film was proposed to be a prequel in the series, an idea that eventually resurfaced with the reboot of the series in 2006, Casino Royale. SMERSH, the fictionalised Soviet counterintelligence agency that featured in Fleming's Casino Royale and several other early James Bond novels, was an acronym for 'Smiert Shpionam' —'Death to Spies'.

=== Casting ===
"I felt it would be wrong to pluck the character out of thin air, or to base him on any of my predecessors' interpretations. Instead, I went to the man who created him, and I was astonished. I'd read a couple of the books years ago, and I thought I'd find them trivial now, but I thoroughly enjoyed every one. It's not just that they've a terrific sense of adventure and you get very involved. On those pages I discovered a Bond I'd never seen on the screen, a quite extraordinary man, a man I really wanted to play, a man of contradictions and opposites."

— Timothy Dalton

In autumn 1985, following the mixed reception of A View to a Kill, work began on scripts for the next Bond film, with the intention that Roger Moore would not reprise the role of James Bond. Moore, who by the time of the release of The Living Daylights would have been 59 years old, chose to retire from the role after 12 years and seven films. Albert Broccoli, however, claimed that he let Moore go from the role.

During an extensive search for a new actor to play Bond, a number of actors, including New Zealander Sam Neill, Irish-born Pierce Brosnan, and Welsh-born stage actor Timothy Dalton, auditioned for the role in 1986. Bond co-producer Michael G. Wilson, director John Glen, Dana and Barbara Broccoli "were impressed with Sam Neill and very much wanted to use him." However, Albert Broccoli was not sold on the actor. In 2022, Neill stated that he had never wanted the role. Meanwhile, Jerry Weintraub, the chairman of MGM/UA Communications, suggested hiring Mel Gibson for a two-picture deal valued at $10 million, but Broccoli was not interested. Other actors touted in the press included Bryan Brown, Michael Nader, Andrew Clarke, and Finlay Light. Antony Hamilton was in talks to play Bond but Broccoli was reportedly hesitant to cast Hamilton as the womanising Bond because, in real life, Hamilton was gay..

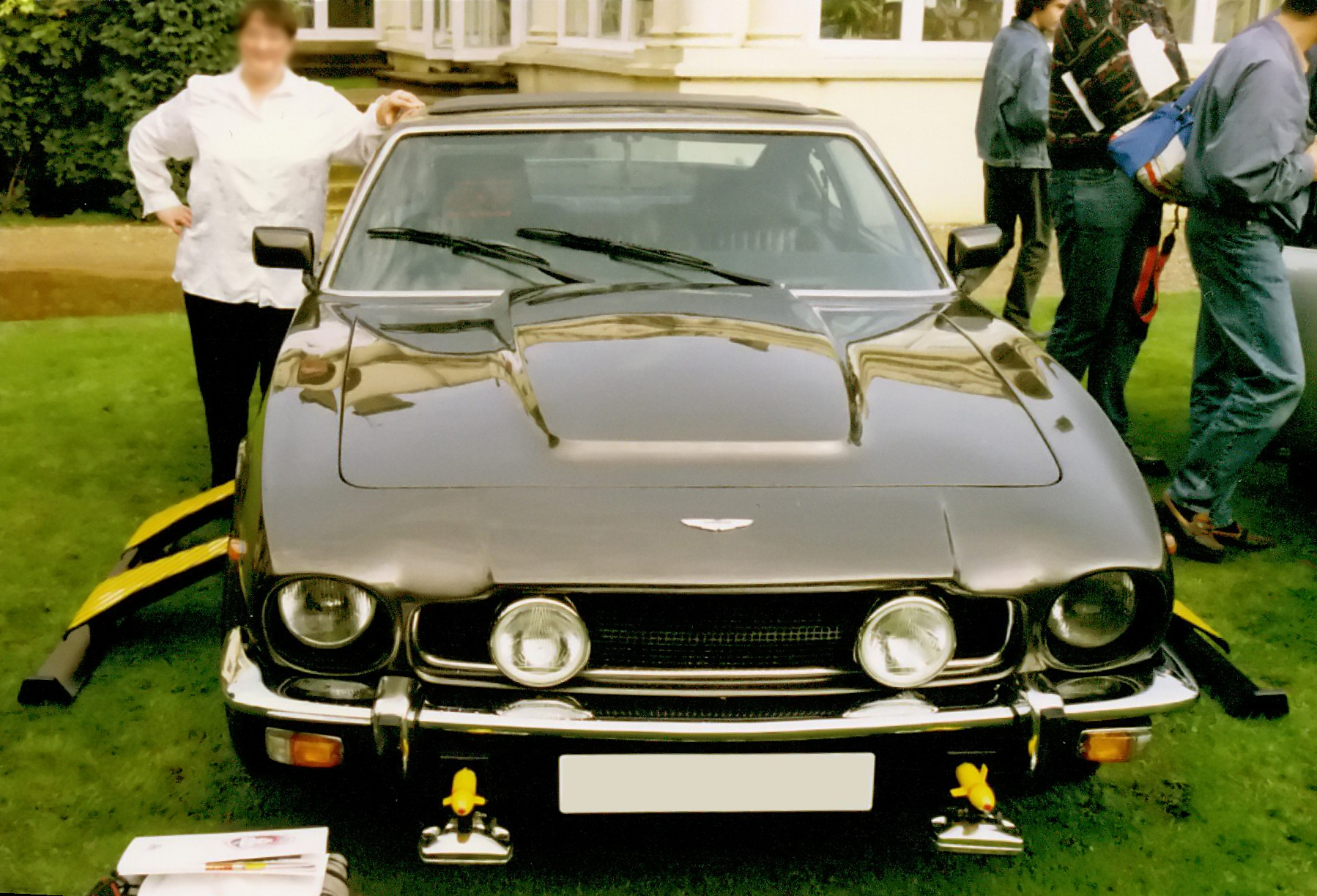
The official car, the Aston Martin V8, at a James Bond convention.

The producers eventually offered the role to Brosnan after a three-day screen-test. At the time, he was contracted to the television series Remington Steele, which had been cancelled by the NBC network due to falling ratings. The announcement that he would be chosen to play James Bond caused a surge in interest in the series, which led to NBC exercising (less than three days prior to expiry) a 60-day option in Brosnan's contract to make a further season of the series. NBC's action caused drastic repercussions, (Note: Not only did Brosnan lose out on the role of James Bond, but his Remington Steele co-star, Stephanie Zimbalist, was also forced to withdraw from her lead role in the science-fiction film RoboCop.) as a result of which Broccoli withdrew the offer given to Brosnan, saying that he did not want the character associated with a contemporary television series. This led to a drop in interest in Remington Steele, and only five new episodes were filmed before the series was finally cancelled. The edict from Broccoli was that "Remington Steele would not be James Bond."

Dana Broccoli suggested Timothy Dalton. Albert Broccoli was initially reluctant given Dalton's public lack of interest in the role, but at his wife's urging agreed to meet the actor. However, Dalton was due to begin filming Brenda Starr and so was unavailable. In the intervening period, having completed Brenda Starr, Dalton was offered the role once again, which he accepted. For a period, the filmmakers had Dalton, but he had not signed a contract. A casting director persuaded Robert Bathurst—an English actor who would become known for his roles in Joking Apart, Cold Feet, and Downton Abbey—to audition for Bond.

Bathurst believes that his "ludicrous audition" was only "an arm-twisting exercise" because the producers wanted to persuade Dalton to take the role by telling him they were still auditioning other actors. Dalton agreed to the film while travelling between airports: "Without anything to do, I decided to start thinking about whether I really, really should or should not do James Bond. Although obviously we'd moved some way along in that process, I just wasn't set on whether I should do it or shan't I do it. But the moment of truth was fast approaching as to whether I'd say yes or no. And that's where I said yes. I picked up the phone from the hotel room in the Miami airport and called them and said, "Yep, you're on: I'll do it."

Dalton's take was very different from that of Moore, regarded as more in line of Ian Fleming's character: a reluctant hero who is often uncomfortable in his job. Dalton wished to create a Bond different from Moore's, feeling he would have declined the project if he were asked to imitate Moore. In contrast to Moore's more jocular approach, Dalton found his creative muse from the original books: "I definitely wanted to recapture the essence and flavour of the books, and play it less flippantly. After all, Bond's essential quality is that he's a man who lives on the edge. He could get killed at any moment, and that stress and danger factor is reflected in the way he lives, chain-smoking, drinking, fast cars and fast women."

Moore declined to watch The Living Daylights in cinema as he did not wish to demonstrate any negative opinions about the project. Broccoli enjoyed the change of tone, feeling that Brosnan would have been too similar to Moore. Neill thought Dalton performed well in the role, and Brosnan called Dalton a good choice in 1987, but felt it too near the bone to watch the finished film. (Note: Brosnan was eventually cast to play James Bond in 1994, with his first appearance coming in 1995's GoldenEye. Brosnan's casting was based on his filmed audition from 1986.) Sean Connery endorsed Dalton in an interview with the Daily Mail, and Desmond Llewelyn enjoyed working with a fellow stage actor.

The English actress Maryam d'Abo, a former model, was cast as the Czechoslovak cellist Kara Milovy. In 1984, d'Abo had attended auditions for the role of Pola Ivanova in A View to a Kill. Barbara Broccoli included d'Abo in the audition for playing Kara, which she later passed. d'Abo presented a longer account in recent years. While she was not chosen for Pola Ivanova, John Glen, the director did notice she had potential. After filming another movie in Germany the director there recommended d'Abo to the Broccoli family. She was in a health club with a different hairstyle from her previous screen test and encountered Barbara Broccoli who praised her new looks and after hearing Glen wanted to see her again, she was chosen.

Originally, the KGB general set up by Koskov was to be General Gogol; however, Walter Gotell was too sick to handle the major role, and the character of Leonid Pushkin replaced Gogol, who appears briefly at the end of the film, having transferred to the Soviet diplomatic service. This was Gogol's final appearance in a James Bond film. Morten Harket, the lead vocalist of the Norwegian rock group a-ha (who performed the film's title song), was offered a minor role as a henchman but declined, because of lack of time and because he believed they wanted to cast him for his popularity rather than his acting. Joe Don Baker was hired based on his performance in Edge of Darkness, which was helmed by future Bond director Martin Campbell.

Director John Glen decided to include the macaw from For Your Eyes Only. It can be seen squawking in the kitchen of Blayden House when Necros attacks MI6's officers.

=== Filming ===
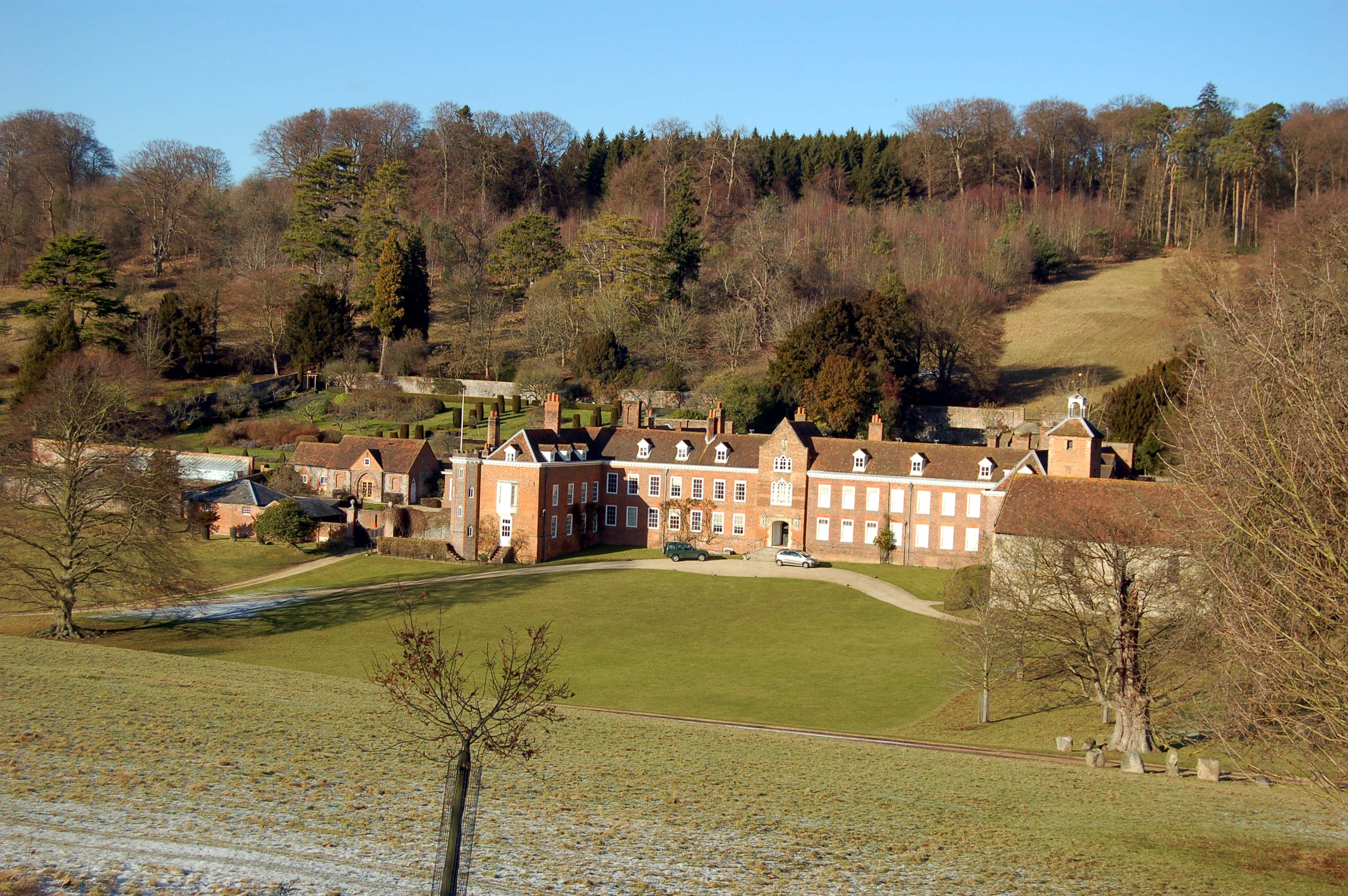
Stonor House

The film was shot at Pinewood Studios at its 007 Stage in the United Kingdom, as well as Weissensee in Austria. The pre-title sequence was filmed on the Rock of Gibraltar and although the sequence shows a hijacked Land Rover careening down various sections of road for several minutes before bursting through a wall towards the sea, the location mostly used the same short stretch of road at the very top of the Rock, shot from numerous different angles. The beach defences seen at the foot of the Rock in the initial shot were also added solely for the film, to an otherwise non-military area. The action involving the Land Rover switched from Gibraltar to Beachy Head in the UK for the shot showing the vehicle actually getting airborne.

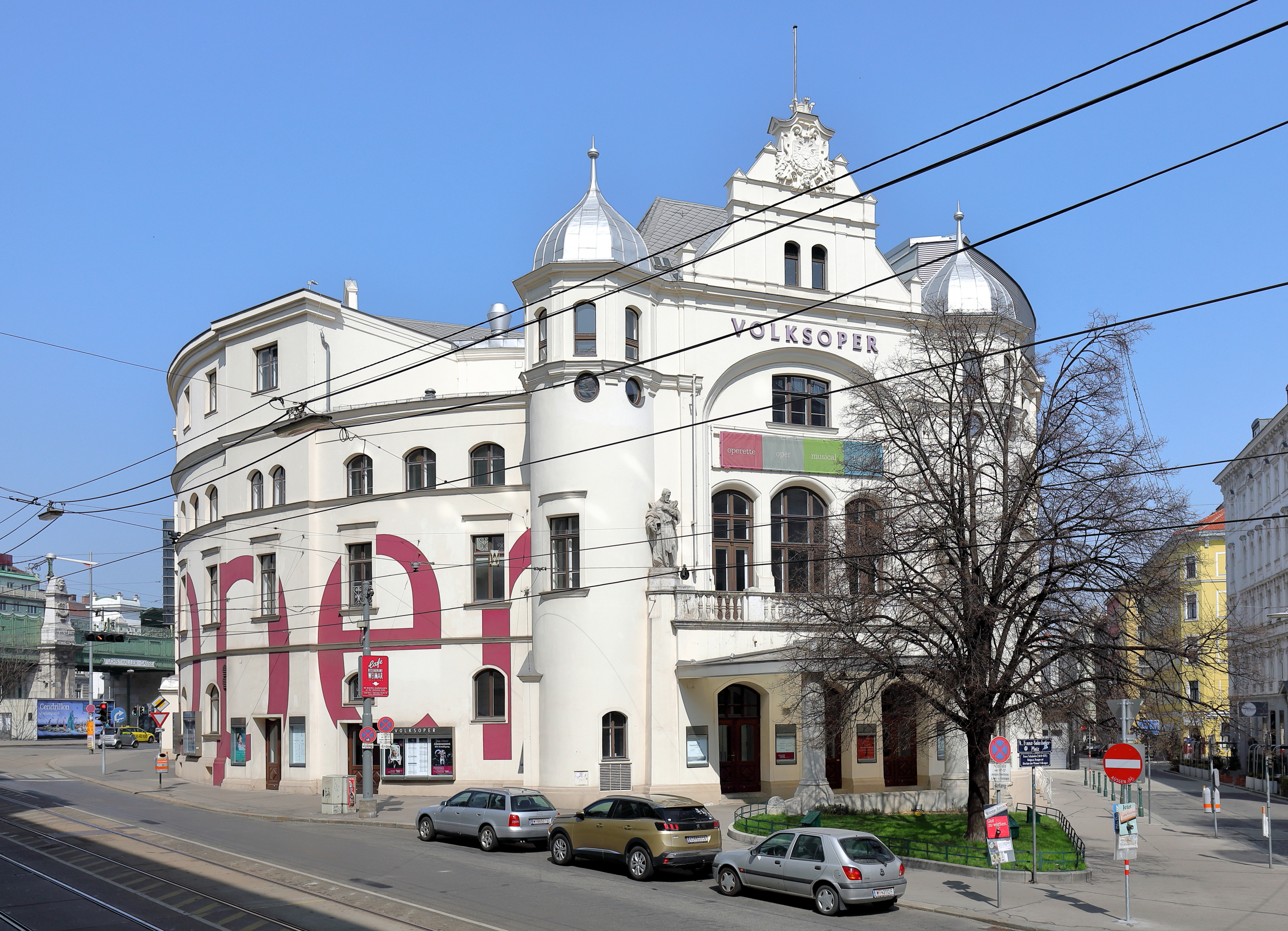
Vienna's Volksoper

Trial runs of the stunt with the Land Rover, during which Bond escapes by parachute from the tumbling vehicle, were filmed in the Mojave Desert in the southwestern United States, although the final cut of the film uses a shot achieved using a dummy. Bratislava sequences were filmed in Vienna. The outside shots of the Bratislava concert hall show the Volksoper, while the interiors were shot in the Sofiensäle. The tram scene was filmed in Währing, Vienna and the border chase was filmed in Carinthia, including the town of Nassfeld, on the Austrian/Italian border. The location used for the home of villain Whitaker was the Forbes Museum in Tangier, Morocco, while desert scenes were shot in Ouarzazate, Morocco. The conclusion of the film was shot at the Schönbrunn Palace, Vienna and Elveden Hall, Suffolk.

Principal photography commenced at Gibraltar on 17 September 1986. Aerial stuntmen B. J. Worth and Jake Lombard performed the pre-credits parachute jump. Both the terrain and wind were unfavourable. Consideration was given to the stunt being done using cranes but aerial stunts arranger B. J. Worth stuck to skydiving and completed the scenes in a day. The aircraft used for the jump was a Lockheed C-130 Hercules, which in the film had M's office installed in the aircraft cabin. The initial point of view for the scene shows M in what appears to be his usual London office, but the camera then zooms out to reveal that it is, in fact, inside an aircraft.

Although marked as a Royal Air Force aircraft, the one in shot belonged to the Spanish Air Force and was used again later in the film for the Afghanistan sequences, this time in Soviet markings. During this later chapter, a fight breaks out on the open ramp of the aircraft in flight between Bond and Necros, before Necros falls to his death. Although the plot and preceding shots suggest the aircraft is a C-130, the shot of Necros falling away from the aircraft show a twin engine cargo plane, a Fairchild C-123 Provider. Worth and Lombard also doubled for Bond and Necros in the scenes where they are hanging and fighting on a bag in a plane's open cargo door, with the exterior shots filmed over the Mojave Desert in the United States.

The press would not meet Dalton and d'Abo until 5 October 1986, when the main unit travelled to Vienna. Almost two weeks after the second unit filming on Gibraltar, the first unit started shooting with Andreas Wisniewski and stunt man Bill Weston. During the course of the three days it took to film this fight, Weston fractured a finger and Wisniewski knocked him out once. The next day found the crew on location at Stonor House, Oxfordshire, doubling for Blayden's Safe House, the first scene Jeroen Krabbé filmed.

d'Abo recalled we were "[o]ne big and happy family traveling and filming together for five months."

==== The return of Aston Martin ====
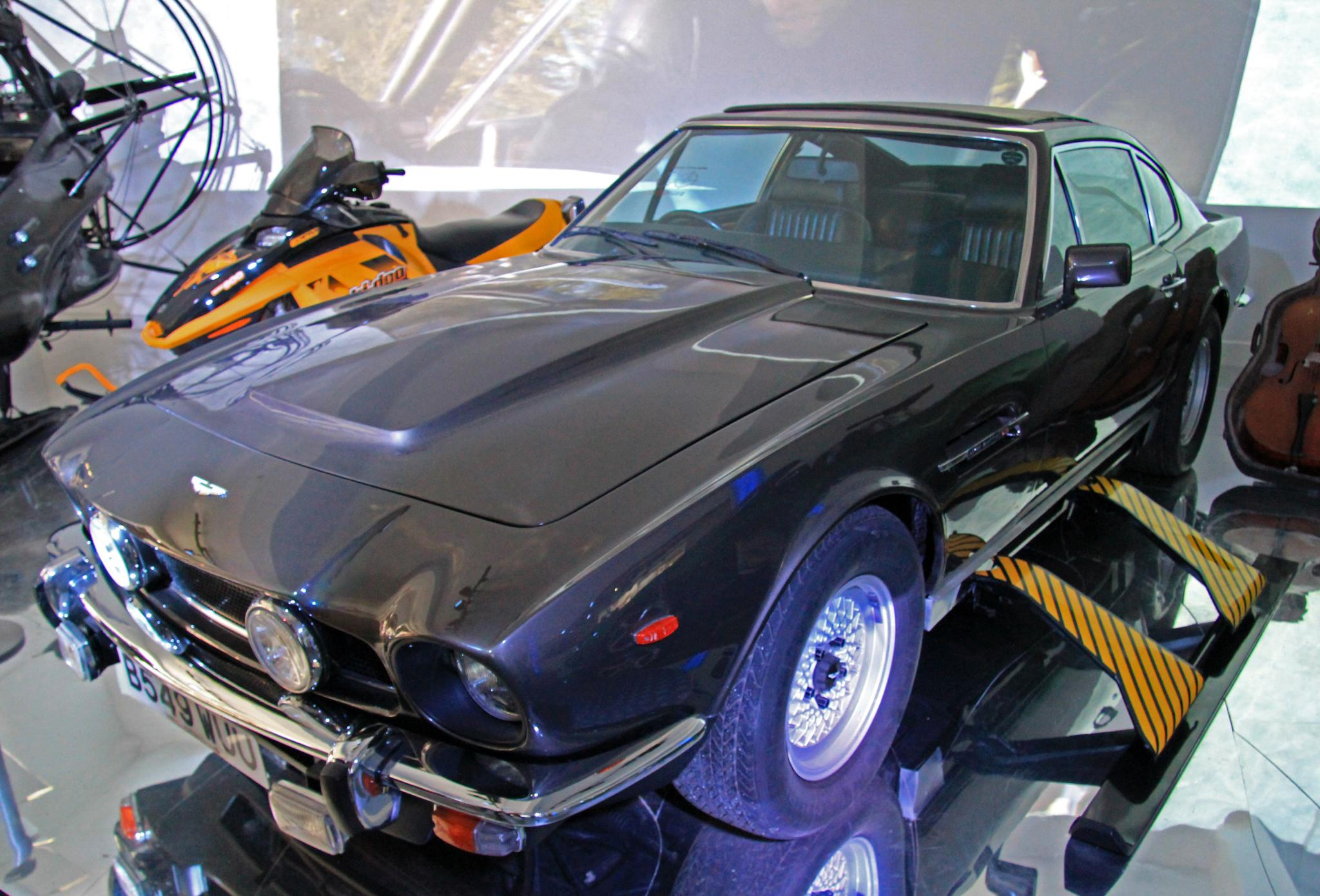
Customised V8 from The Living Daylights at the National Motor Museum, Beaulieu, one of two versions used in the film.

The film reunites Bond with the car maker Aston Martin. Following Bond's use of the Aston Martin DBS in On Her Majesty's Secret Service, the filmmakers then turned to the brand new Lotus Esprit in 1977's The Spy Who Loved Me, which reappeared four years later in For Your Eyes Only. Aston Martin then returned with their Aston Martin V8.

Two different Aston Martin models were used in filming—a V8 Volante convertible, and later for the Czechoslovakia scenes, a hard-top V8 saloon rebadged to look like the Volante. The Volante was a production model owned by then Aston Martin Lagonda chairman, Victor Gauntlett.

=== Music ===
The Living Daylights was the final Bond film to be scored by composer John Barry. The soundtrack is notable for its introduction of sequenced electronic rhythm tracks overdubbed with the orchestra—at the time, a relatively new innovation.

The title song of the film, "The Living Daylights", was co-written with Pål Waaktaar of the Norwegian synth-pop group a-ha and recorded by the band. The group and Barry did not collaborate well, resulting in two versions of the theme song. Barry's film mix is heard on the soundtrack (and on a-ha's later compilation album Headlines and Deadlines). The version preferred by the band can be heard on the a-ha album Stay on These Roads, released in 1988. However, in 2006, Waaktaar complimented Barry's contributions: "I loved the stuff he added to the track, I mean it gave it this really cool string arrangement. That's when for me it started to sound like a Bond thing". The title song is one of the few 007 title songs not performed or written by a British or American performer.

In a departure from previous Bond films, The Living Daylights was the first to use different songs over the opening and end credits. The song heard over the end credits, "If There Was A Man" (which also acts as the "love theme" of the film), was one of two songs performed for the film by The Pretenders, with Chrissie Hynde on lead vocals. The other song, "Where Has Everybody Gone?", is heard from Necros's Walkman in the film—the melody of the song is subsequently used in the score to announce Necros whenever he attacks. The Pretenders were originally considered to perform the title song. However, the producers had been pleased with the commercial success of Duran Duran's "A View to a Kill", and felt that a-ha would be more likely to make an impact on the charts.

The original soundtrack was released on LP and CD by Warner Bros. and featured only 12 tracks. Later re-releases by Rykodisc and EMI added nine additional tracks, including alternate instrumental end credits music. Rykodisc's version included the gun barrel and opening sequence of the film as well as the jailbreak sequence, and the bombing of the bridge.

Additionally, the film featured a number of pieces of classical music, as the main Bond girl, Kara Milovy, is a cellist. Mozart's 40th Symphony in G minor (1st movement) is performed by the orchestra at the Conservatoire in Bratislava when Koskov flees. As Moneypenny tells Bond, Kara is next to perform Alexander Borodin's String Quartet in D major, and the finale to Act II of Mozart's The Marriage of Figaro (in Vienna) also features. When arriving in Vienna, an orchestra outside the hotel is playing a movement from the Wein, Weib und Gesang waltz by Johann Strauss. Before Bond is drugged by Kara, she is practicing the Cello solo from the first movement of Dvořák's cello concerto in B minor., Kara and an orchestra (conducted onscreen by John Barry) perform Tchaikovsky's Variations on a Rococo Theme to rapturous applause.

== Release ==
The Prince and Princess of Wales attended the film's premiere on 29 June 1987 at the Odeon Leicester Square in London. In the three days following the premiere, the film grossed £52,656 in Leicester Square and £13,049 at the Odeon Marble Arch before expanding to 18 screens where it grossed £136,503 for the weekend, finishing third at the UK box office for the weekend and second for the week behind The Secret of My Success. The following week it expanded to 60 screens and grossed £252,940 for the weekend, finishing second to Police Academy 4: Citizens on Patrol. A week later it expanded to 116 screens but remained in second place for the weekend with a gross of £523,264 however finally reached number one for the week with a gross of £1,072,420 from 131 screens. It went on to gross £8.2 million ($19 million) in the UK. On the film's opening weekend in the US, it grossed $11 million, surpassing the $5.2 million grossed by The Lost Boys that was released on the same day, and setting a record 3-day opening for a Bond film, beating Octopussy's (1983) $8.9 million. However, it did not beat the 4-day record of $13.3 million set by A View to a Kill (1985). It went on to gross $51.2 million in the United States and Canada. The Living Daylights grossed the equivalent of $191.2 million worldwide. Other large international grosses include $19.5 million in Germany, $12.6 million in Japan and $11.4 million in France.

In the film, Koskov and Whitaker repeatedly use vehicles and drug packets marked with the Red Cross. This action angered a number of Red Cross Societies, which sent letters of protest regarding the film. In addition, the British Red Cross attempted to prosecute the filmmakers and distributors. However, no legal action was taken. As a result, the producers included a disclaimer regarding the use of the Red Cross in the opening.

== Reception ==
Rita Kempley, reviewing for The Washington Post, praised Dalton's performance, naming him:

The best Bond ever. He's as classy as the trademark tuxedo, as sleek as the Aston Martin. Like Bond's notorious martini, women who encounter his carved-granite good looks are shaken, not stirred.

Furthermore, she praised the film as "graciously paced, though overplotted, so some seat-shifting sets in about 30 minutes before the end." Janet Maslin of The New York Times complimented Dalton's performance, feeling that he had "enough presence, the right debonair looks and the kind of energy that the Bond series has lately been lacking." While praising the supporting characters, she criticised the long runtime and noted Glen's direction "has the colorful but perfunctory style that goes with the territory, and it's adequate if uninspired."

Roger Ebert of the Chicago Sun-Times gave The Living Daylights two stars out of four, criticising the lack of humour in the protagonist and feeling General Whitaker was "not one of the great Bond villains. He's a kooky phony general who plays with toy soldiers and never seems truly diabolical. Without a great Bond girl, a great villain or a hero with a sense of humor, The Living Daylights belongs somewhere on the lower rungs of the Bond ladder. But there are some nice stunts." Gene Siskel of The Chicago Tribune also gave the film two stars out of four, commending Dalton as superior to Roger Moore but feeling he "simply doesn't have the manliness or the charm of Sean Connery." He criticised the film for its perceived tentativeness, writing that the "filmmakers were trying to strike a middle ground between the glamor of the Connery Bond films and the dubious humor of the Moore Bonds. The result is a film that is not so much bad as mechanical and uptight."

Carrie Rickey of The Philadelphia Inquirer felt Dalton "makes for an appealing Bond, and with his distinctive bow-shaped mouth and the cleft in his chin, no one is likely to confuse [him] with the blandness that was George Lazenby or the corseted stiffness that was Roger Moore, two prior Bonds. And unlike Sean Connery's cooly sadistic agent, Dalton's 007 has exquisite manners — both of the bedside and roadside variety." Jay Scott of The Globe and Mail wrote of Dalton's Bond that "you get the feeling that on his off nights, he might curl up with the Reader's Digest and catch an episode of Moonlighting". Derek Malcolm of The Guardian wrote Dalton "hasn't the natural authority of Connery nor the facile charm of Moore, but George Lazenby he is not. He is, in fact, four-square on the Balham Line — decent, daring, not above unorthodoxy but unlikely to ask Q for a fool-proof condom for the Aids era." Overall, he felt the film was "a slightly more sensible Bond than before, allowing for glasnost — the Ruskies aren't all bad — and suggesting 007 has at least grown less like a predatory little boy."

Jay Boyar of the Orlando Sentinel noted: "Dalton shows a serious side that's been missing from the role since Sean Connery's earliest 007 days. And as a whole, the new picture is less of a special-effects affair than most of Roger Moore's Bond films. There's no shortage of action in The Living Daylights, but the movie adds up to a real adventure." Richard Corliss of Time magazine gave the film a positive review, stating Dalton "finds some of the lethal charm of Sean Connery, along with a touch of crabby Harrison Ford. This Bond is as fast on his feet as with his wits; an ironic scowl creases his face; he's battle ready yet war-weary."

=== Retrospective reviews ===
Retrospective reviews of the film have been considerably more positive. The Independent placed the film as the fourth best Bond movie, praising the tough, nervy edge Dalton brought to the franchise. Dalton himself has said he preferred The Living Daylights over Licence to Kill. Dalton's predecessor, Roger Moore, discussing the Bond series in 2012, called the film a "bloody good movie". IGN lauded the film for bringing back realism and espionage to the film series, and showing James Bond's dark side. Les Roopanarine, in a retrospective review for The Guardian, called the film his favourite Bond film, praising Dalton for "bringing a more nuanced interpretation to the role, with his relationships evolving in a way never seen before in previous Bond films."

In a poll involving Bond experts and fans of the franchise, The Living Daylights was ranked the sixth-best Bond film. The review aggregation website Rotten Tomatoes gives the film an approval rating of 75% based on 59 reviews, with an average rating of 6.4/10. The website's critical consensus states, "Newcomer Timothy Dalton plays James Bond with more seriousness than preceding installments, and the result is exciting and colorful but occasionally humorless." On Metacritic it has a score of 59 based on 18 critics, indicating "mixed or average reviews". Audiences surveyed by CinemaScore gave the film a grade "A" on scale of A to F.

Retrospective reviews have been critical of the portrayal of the mujahideen in the film, with The Atlantic writing that the film failed to capture "the complexities of their historical moment". Others have said that the film "sidesteps more problematic aspects of mujahideen activities" and that "any critical reading of the film in light of modern Afghanistan, and the post-Soviet incarnations/evolution of the Mujahedeen, I lock securely in the box marked 'Let's Not Go There.'"

== See also ==
- Outline of James Bond

== Sources ==
- Broccoli, Albert R; Zec, Donald (1998). When the Snow Melts: The Autobiography of Cubby Broccoli. London: Boxtree. ISBN 978-0-7522-1162-6.
- Cork, John; Scivally, Bruce (2002). James Bond: The Legacy. Harry N. Abrams. ISBN 978-0-8109-3296-8.
- Duncan, Paul (2015). The James Bond Archives. Taschen. ISBN 978-3-836-55186-1.
- Field, Matthew; Chowdhury, Ajay (2015). Some Kind of Hero: The Remarkable Story of the James Bond Films. The History Press. ISBN 978-0-7509-6421-0. OCLC 930556527.
- Helfenstein, Charles (2012). The Making of The Living Daylights. Spies LLC. ISBN 978-0-984-41262-4.
- McKay, Sinclair (2008). The Man with the Golden Touch: How The Bond Films Conquered the World. London: Penguin Books. ISBN 978-1-59020-298-2.
