= Dennis Murphy (screenwriter) =

American screenwriter and novelist

Dennis Murphy (August 27, 1932 – October 6, 2005) was a screenwriter and author, known for his 1958 best selling book The Sergeant, for which he wrote the screenplay for the 1968 film of the same name.

Murphy was born and raised in Salinas, California. At age 25, his novel The Sergeant was published, and became an international best seller. Family friend John Steinbeck (Murphy's grandfather delivered Steinbeck), who wrote several letters to Murphy, was also highly complimentary of it. In 1959, he was looked up by an itinerant Hunter S. Thompson, who appreciated his work. They became friends, and Thompson lived on the Murphy estate for a time. Murphy wrote the screenplay for the movie version of the novel, and he worked in Southern California as a screenwriter for over 30 years. He moved to San Francisco in 1994, where he died at his home from cancer in October 2005.

His older brother, Michael Murphy, is co-founder of the Esalen Institute.
