= Walter Gotell =

German-British actor (1924–1997)

- Gotell, as General Anatol Gogol in The Spy Who Loved Me (1977).
- Born: Walter Jacques Goettel; 15 March 1924; Bonn, Rhenish Prussia, Germany
- Died: 5 May 1997 (aged 73); London, England
- Occupation: Actor
- Years active: 1942–1997
- Spouses: Yvonne Hills (m. 1958; died 1974); Celeste F. Mitchell (m. 1974)
- Children: 1

Walter Jack Gotell (born Walter Jacques Goettel; 15 March 1924 – 5 May 1997) was a German-British actor. He was well known for his role as General Gogol, head of the KGB, in the Roger Moore era of the James Bond film series as well as having played the role of Morzeny, a supporting villain, in From Russia With Love. He also appeared as Gogol in the final part of The Living Daylights (1987), Timothy Dalton's debut Bond film.

== Early life ==
Gotell was born Walter Jacques Goettel in Bonn in 1924, to Jewish parents Margarete Wilhelmine (née Cohn) and Jakob Goettel. He was raised mainly in Berlin. Due to rising antisemitism and the growing influence of Nazism, Gotell and his family emigrated to the United Kingdom in 1938, and he was naturalised as a British citizen in 1948.

Gotell became interested in acting during secondary school, and he began acting in repertory theatre as a teenager.

== Career ==
Due to a shortage of young actors during World War II, Gotell began working in films starting in 1942. His bilingualism saw him cast as Nazi German villains and military men, such as in We Dive at Dawn (1943).

He began to have more established roles by the early 1950s, appearing in The African Queen (1951), The Red Beret (1953) for Albert R. Broccoli, Ice Cold in Alex (1958), The Guns of Navarone (1961), The Road to Hong Kong (1962), Lord Jim (1965), Black Sunday (1977), The Boys from Brazil (1978) and Cuba (1979).

His first role in the James Bond film series was in 1963, when he played the henchman Morzeny in From Russia with Love. From the late 1970s, he played the recurring role of KGB General Anatol Gogol in the series, beginning with The Spy Who Loved Me (1977). Gotell gained the role of Gogol because of his resemblance to the former head of Soviet secret police Lavrentiy Beria. The character returned in Moonraker (1979), For Your Eyes Only (1981), Octopussy (1983), A View to a Kill (1985), and The Living Daylights (1987). As the Cold War neared its end, the role of leader of the KGB was seen to change attitudes to the West – from direct competitor to collaborator. Gotell is one of a few actors to have played a villain and a Bond ally in the film series (others being Charles Gray, Richard Kiel and Joe Don Baker).

Throughout his career, Gotell also made numerous guest appearances in television series including Danger Man, Knight Rider, The A-Team, Airline, Airwolf, The X-Files, Scarecrow and Mrs. King, MacGyver, Star Trek: The Next Generation, Miami Vice, Cagney & Lacey and The Saint among others. He played Chief Constable Cullen in Softly, Softly: Task Force (1969–75). Other television roles included that of Sam Baker, a KGB agent in the hard-hitting British police drama The Professionals (1978) – the episode titled "The Female Factor".

== Personal life and death ==
Gotell was married to actress Yvonne Hills from 1958, until her death in 1974. They had one daughter, born in 1960. Gotell married Celeste F. Mitchell in 1974.

Gotell was a businessman as well as an actor and used his acting salaries to fund his business interests. He managed several engineering firms, and he owned a cottage in Co. Galway, Ireland.

Gotell died from cancer on 5 May 1997, aged 73.

== Filmography ==
=== Film ===
- The Day Will Dawn (1942) as German Soldier (uncredited)
- The Goose Steps Out (1942) as SS Guard (uncredited)
- Secret Mission (1942) as Lieutenant Langfeld (uncredited)
- Tomorrow We Live (1943) as Hans
- We Dive at Dawn (1943) as Luftwaffe Captain (uncredited)
- Schweik's New Adventures (1943) as Captured resistance member
- The Night Invader (1943)
- Two Thousand Women (1944) as German Soldier (uncredited)
- No Orchids for Miss Blandish (1948) as Joe – Nightclub Doorman (uncredited)
- Cairo Road (1950) as Prison Officer
- The Wooden Horse (1950) as The Follower
- Lilli Marlene (1950) as Direktor of Propaganda
- The Man Who Disappeared (1951) as Luzatto
- The African Queen (1951) as the Second Officer of the Königin Luise
- Desperate Moment (1953) as Ravitch's Servant-Henchman
- The Red Beret (1953) as German sentry
- Albert R.N. (1953) as Feldwebel
- Stryker of the Yard (1953)
- Duel in the Jungle (1954) as Jim
- Above Us the Waves (1955) as German Officer on Tirpitz. (uncredited)
- Dial 999 (1956) as Policeman (uncredited)
- 1984 (1956) as Guard (uncredited)
- The Man Who Knew Too Much (1956) as Matthews, Scotland Yard Patrol Car (uncredited)
- Ice Cold in Alex (1958) as 1st German Officer
- The Man Inside (1958) as Profuno
- I Was Monty's Double (1958) as German Colonel
- The Bandit of Zhobe (1959) as Azhad
- No Safety Ahead (1959) (uncredited)
- The Treasure of San Teresa (1959) as Hamburg inspector
- Sink the Bismarck! (1959) as Signals Officer Miller on the Bismarck (uncredited)
- Circus of Horrors (1960) as Baron Von Gruber (uncredited)
- The Two Faces of Dr. Jekyll (1960) as Heverton – Second Gambler (uncredited)
- Circle of Deception (1960) as Phoney Jules Ballard
- The Guns of Navarone (1961) as Oberleutnant Muesel
- The Devil's Daffodil (1961) as Oberinspektor Whiteside / Supt. Whiteside
- The Road to Hong Kong (1962) as Dr. Zorbb (3rd Echelon scientist)
- The Devil's Agent (1962) as Dr. Ritter
- The Longest Day (1962) as German Officer (uncredited)
- 55 Days at Peking (1963) as Capt. Hoffman
- The Damned (1963) as Major Holland
- Lancelot and Guinevere (1963) as Cedric
- From Russia with Love (1963) as Morzeny
- Lord Jim (1965) as Captain of Patna
- The Spy Who Came In From The Cold (1965) as Holten (uncredited)
- Attack on the Iron Coast (1968) as Van Horst
- Cry Wolf (1969)
- The File of the Golden Goose (1969) as George Leeds
- Our Miss Fred (1972) as Schmidt
- Endless Night (1972) as Constantine
- Black Sunday (1977) as Colonel Riat
- The Spy Who Loved Me (1977) as General Anatol Gogol
- The Assignment (1977) as Frankenheimer
- March or Die (1977) as Col. Lamont
- The Stud (1978) as Ben Khaled
- The Boys from Brazil (1978) as Mundt
- The Word (1978) as Hennig
- The London Connection (1979) as Simmons
- Moonraker (1979) as General Anatol Gogol
- Cuba (1979) as Don Jose Pulido
- Flygnivå 450 (1980) as Herbert Anchell
- For Your Eyes Only (1981) as General Anatol Gogol
- The Scarlet and the Black (1983) as SS-Obergruppenführer Max Helm (Karl Wolff)
- Octopussy (1983) as General Anatol Gogol
- Kalabaliken i Bender (1983) as Storvesiren
- Memed My Hawk (1984) as Sgt. Asim
- A View to a Kill (1985) as General Anatol Gogol
- KGB: The Secret War (1985) as Nicholai
- Basic Training (1985) as Nabokov
- The Living Daylights (1987) as General Anatol Gogol
- Sleepaway Camp II: Unhappy Campers (1988) as Uncle John
- Wings of Fame (1990) as Receptionist
- Puppet Master III: Toulon's Revenge (1991) as General Müeller
- Prince Valiant (1997) as Erik the Old (final film role)

=== Television ===
- Sherlock Holmes – episode – "The Man Who Disappeared (pilot)" (1951) as Luzatto
- The Saint – episode – "The Hi-jackers" (1964) as Hans Lasser
- Walt Disney's Wonderful World of Color – 3 episodes – (1964 & 1979) as Benton / Simmons
- Sherlock Holmes – episode – "Wisteria Lodge" (1968) as Henderson
- The Zoo Gang – episode – "Revenge: Post-Dated" (1974) as Boucher
- Softly, Softly: Task Force (1969–1975) – 55 episodes – as Chief Constable Arthur Cullen
- Hallelujah! as Lt. Colonel Henderson
- The Professionals (6 January 1978), Series 1, episode 2 "The Female Factor" – as Baker
- Scarecrow and Mrs. King – episode – "Service Above and Beyond" (1983) as Kurt Hollander
- Airwolf – episode – "Fight Like a Dove" (1984) as Oberst Helmut Krüger / Hans Daubert
- Fantasy Island – episode – "Bojangles and the Dancer/Deuces Are Wild" (1984) as Edward C. Bass / Charles Childress
- The A-Team – episode – "Where Is the Monster When You Need Him?" (1985) as Ramon DeJarro
- One Life to Live – multiple episodes (1986) as Dirk Keller
- Spenser for Hire – episode – "A Madness Most Discreet" (1986) as Max Claus
- Knight Rider – episode – "Knight Sting" (1985) as Simon Carascas
- MacGyver – episode – "GX-1" (1987) as Starkoss
- Miami Vice – episode – "When Irish Eyes Are Crying" (1986) as Max Klizer
- Star Trek: The Next Generation – episode – "Home Soil" (1988) as Kurt Mandl
- MacGyver – episode – "Gold Rush" (1989) as General Barenov
- The X-Files – episode – "Paper Clip" (1995) as Victor Klemper

=== Other appearances ===
- Inside 'From Russia with Love' – Video documentary short (2000) – Himself / Morzeny
