= Andreas Wisniewski =

German actor and former dancer (born 1959)

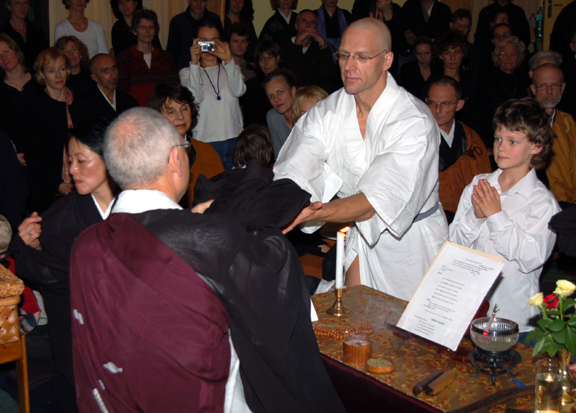
- Wisniewski with his son at a Zen Buddhist ceremony, 5 January 2005
- Born: 3 July 1959 (age 66); West Berlin, West Germany
- Years active: 1986–present
- Children: 3

Andreas Wisniewski (born 3 July 1959) is a German actor and former dancer. He is best known for his portrayals of Necros in the 1987 Bond film The Living Daylights, Max's companion in the 1996 film Mission: Impossible, and as one of Hans Gruber's henchmen, Tony, in 1988's Die Hard.

== Early life ==
Wisniewski was born in West Berlin, West Germany, to a Polish father and a German mother, and spent the early part of his life dancing before turning to acting.

== Career ==
Wisniewski made his big-screen debut in Gothic (1986), a film about Mary Shelley's Frankenstein, in which Wisniewski plays the role of Fletcher.

In the 1987 James Bond film The Living Daylights, the 6 ft 3 in (191 cm) Wisniewski portrays the assassin Necros. His next mainstream role was as one of Hans Gruber's henchmen, Tony Vreski, in the 1988 film Die Hard.

Wisniewski then had roles in the TV shows Superboy, Mann & Machine and Northern Exposure. He later appeared in the 1995 science fiction film Death Machine playing Weyland, and again in 1996 in a non-speaking role as Max's companion in another box office smash, Mission: Impossible.

Wisniewski then moved into German films, after which he reappeared to UK audiences in an episode of the TV series Lock, Stock...The Series based on the gangster film by Guy Ritchie. Two years later he was in an episode of the ITV hit series Ultimate Force alongside popular soap opera star Ross Kemp playing Serbian terrorist Savo Glasnovic. Wisniewski hit the screens (although his face is never seen) in the UK again in 2008 after a six-year break when he co-starred in Mark Tonderai's cat-and-mouse thriller Hush.

Wisniewski has also appeared in two music videos. He was in the video "Venus", sung by the girl group Bananarama, and also appeared as a soldier in the background of Elton John's video "Nikita", where he can be seen as Elton John's Bentley Continental pulls up to the security gate.

In 2001, Wisniewski turned his hand to directing, making the short film Inspiration, starring English actors Danny Webb and Christine Adams. Another Andreas Wisniewski, credited in the biopic Surviving Picasso alongside Anthony Hopkins, is a different actor. Wisniewski has kept a low profile since this time to spend time with his family and children and to concentrate on Buddhism.

He made an appearance in ITV's police drama The Bill. He appeared on 10 July 2008 in the episode Gun Runner: Pay and Spray, in which he played a short one-minute role as a Russian criminal 'Dimitri' purchasing guns and ammunition.

Fifteen years after his first appearance in a Mission: Impossible film, he had another non-speaking part in 2011's Mission: Impossible – Ghost Protocol, playing the same character from the first film of the series.

== Personal life ==
Wisniewski has three children and lives in Berlin. He is a practising Zen Buddhist.

== Filmography ==
=== Film ===
Year	Title	Role	Notes
1986	Gothic	Fletcher	
1987	Aria		Segment "Nessun dorma"
1987	The Living Daylights	Necros	
1988	Die Hard	Tony Vreski	
1993	The Hit List	Lance	
1994	Death Machine	Weyland	
1996	Mission: Impossible	Max's Companion	
1996	Surviving Picasso	German Soldier	
1998	The Tribe	Lieutenant	
1998	Urban Ghost Story	Quinn	
1998	Helden und andere Feiglinge (Heroes and Other Cowards)	Ernesto	
2008	Hush	The Tarman	
2008	The Scorpion King 2: Rise of a Warrior	Pollux	
2010	Centurion	Commander Gratus	
2011	Urban Explorer	Neo-Nazi	
2011	Mission: Impossible – Ghost Protocol	The Fog's Contact	
2013	Bela Kiss: Prologue	Private Charles Nagy (voice)	
2017	Instrument of War	Karl Herrmann	

=== Television ===
Year	Title	Role	Notes
1989	Superboy	Android	Episode: "Superboy... Rest in Peace"
1992	Northern Exposure	Arthur	Episode: "Wake Up Call"
1992	Mann & Machine	John Stepka	Episode: "Billion Dollar Baby"
1994	Between the Lines	Maus	Episodes: "The End User: Part I" and "The End User: Part II"
1996	Ein starkes Team	Rohler	Episode: "Eins zu Eins"
1997	Supply & Demand	John Howard	Episode: "Pilot"
1997	Gegen den Wind	Glen	Episode: "Die Herausforderung"
1997	Der Fahnder		Episode: "Beckers letzter Fall"
1998	Die Wache	Bruno Mögelsdorf	Episode: "Tod eines Indianers"
1998	Kidnapping Mom & Dad	Holger	Television film
1998	Balko	Jürgen Fromm	Episode: "Blutige Beute"
1998	Alarm for Cobra 11 – The Highway Police	Harry	Episode: "Die Anhalterin"
1999	The Waiting Time	Ernst Raub	Television film
1999	Coast Guard	Waschnikow	Episode: "Das trojanische Pferd"
2000	In the Name of the Law	Klaus Jacobi	Episode: "Tod auf Raten"
2000	Lock, Stock...	Heinrich	Episode: "...and Spaghetti Sauce"
2000	Die Motorrad-Cops – Hart am Limit	Killian	Episode: "Volles Risiko"
2002	Our Charly	Lutz Rabenau	Episode: "Mausefallen"
2002	Coast Guard	Kessler	Episode: "Unter Feuer"
2002	Ultimate Force	Glasnovic	Episode: "Something to Do with Justice"
2003	SOKO München	Dr. Fritz Haas	Episode: "Bube, Dame, Mord"
2008	The Bill	Dimitri	Episodes: "Gun Runner: Spray and Pray" and "Gun Runner: Fire Fight"
2020	GOSH interviews	Himself	Talk show

=== Music videos ===
Year	Title	Role	Artist
1985	"Nikita"	Officer	Elton John
1986	"Venus"	Dancer	Bananarama
