= Joe Don Baker =

American actor (1936–2025)

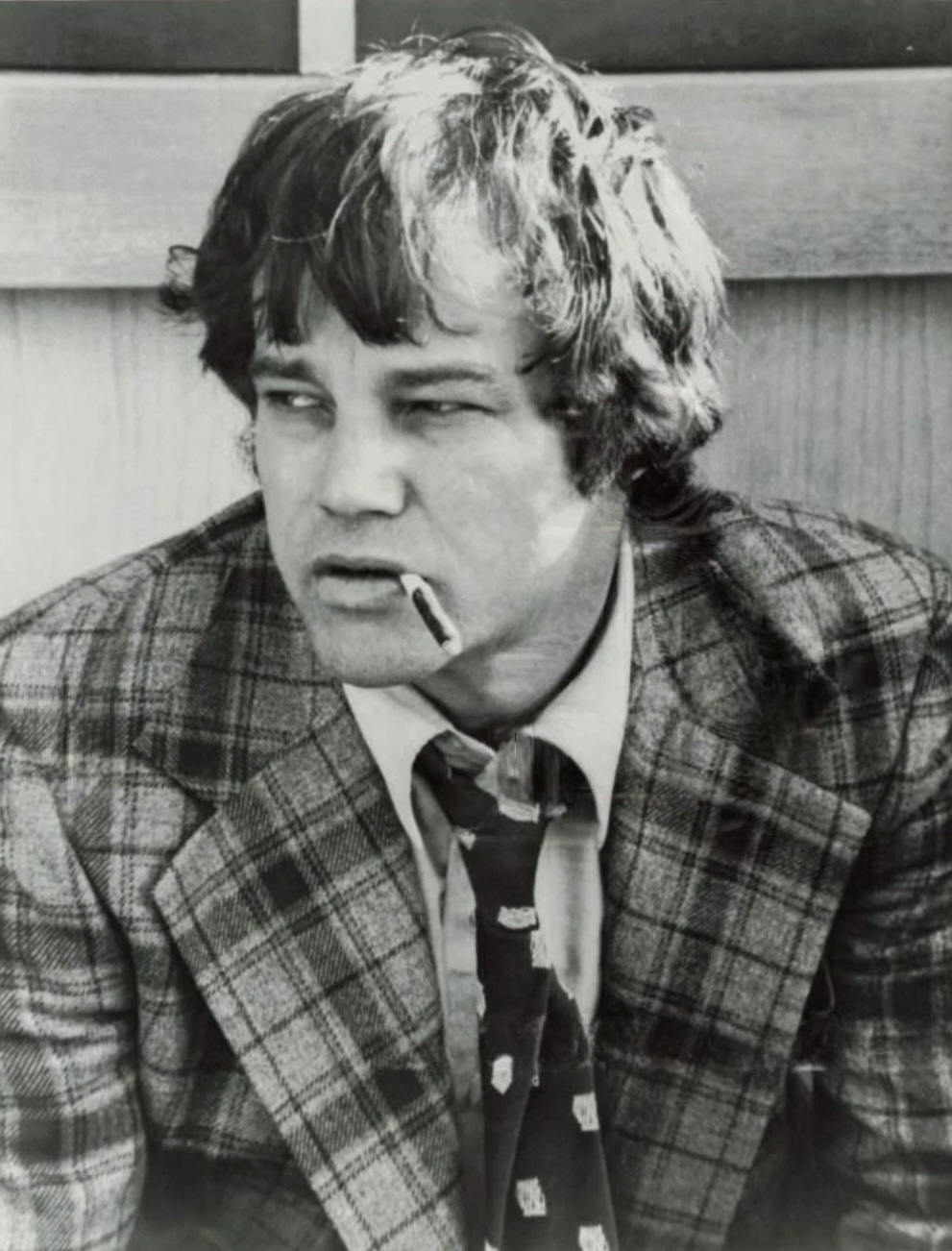
- Baker in Mitchell (1975)
- Born: February 12, 1936; Groesbeck, Texas, U.S.
- Died: May 7, 2025 (aged 89); Los Angeles, California, U.S.
- Education: North Texas State (now University of North Texas)
- Occupation: Actor
- Years active: 1963–2012
- Spouse: Marlo Baker (m. 1969; div. 1980)

Joe Don Baker (February 12, 1936 – May 7, 2025) was an American actor, known for playing "tough guy" characters on both sides of the law. He established himself as an action star with supporting roles in the Westerns Guns of the Magnificent Seven (1969) and Wild Rovers (1971), before his breakthrough role as real-life Tennessee Sheriff Buford Pusser in the film Walking Tall (1973).

Throughout the 1970s and 1980s, Baker found success playing both leading and supporting roles, including a mafia hitman in Charley Varrick (1973), a brute force detective in Mitchell (1975), a legendary baseball player in The Natural (1984), a police chief in the Chevy Chase comedy Fletch (1985), and a morally dubious private investigator in Martin Scorsese's Cape Fear (1991). He was in three James Bond films, as both a villain and an ally, portraying Brad Whitaker in The Living Daylights (1987) with Timothy Dalton, and CIA agent Jack Wade in GoldenEye (1995) and Tomorrow Never Dies (1997) with Pierce Brosnan.

For his portrayal of offbeat CIA agent Darius Jedburgh in the BBC television serial Edge of Darkness (1985), he was nominated for a BAFTA TV Award for Best Actor. He was also nominated for a Satellite Award for Best Supporting Actor for playing Alabama governor Big Jim Folsom in the made-for-television film George Wallace (1997).

== Early life and education ==
Baker was born in Groesbeck, Texas, the son of Edna (née McDonald) and Doyle Charles Baker. He was raised by his aunt Anna Thompson after the death of his mother when he was 12. He played basketball and football (as linebacker and co-captain) at Groesbeck High School, and attended North Texas State College in Denton on a sports scholarship, where he was a member of the Sigma Phi Epsilon fraternity. He graduated with a Bachelor of Business Administration degree in 1958.

After serving in the United States Army for two years, Baker moved to New York City to study at the Actors Studio, of which he was a life member. He cited Robert Mitchum (with whom he would work in Cape Fear) and Spencer Tracy as his inspirations.

== Career ==
=== Early roles ===
During the 1963–64 Broadway season, he appeared on stage in Marathon '33 at the ANTA Theatre in New York City. His career had its roots in television, though he did appear in several movies, including an uncredited part in the 1967 film Cool Hand Luke. He appeared in many television series, graduating to featured guest roles in such series as The Big Valley (in which he played a Harvard-educated Native American with a penchant for fighting) and Mod Squad (where he appeared as an illiterate vending machine robber). He was the title character in the 1971 TV movie Mongo's Back in Town, starring Telly Savalas.

Standing at 6'2" tall (189 cm), Baker's physical prowess and stereotypical Texas drawl would prove perfect in Westerns, both on film and television. While working regularly on television on shows such as Bonanza and Gunsmoke, he appeared in supporting roles in such films Guns of the Magnificent Seven (1969) and Blake Edwards' Wild Rovers, but his film career did not quicken until he scored the role of Steve McQueen's younger brother in Sam Peckinpah's Junior Bonner, a film about a contemporary rodeo cowboy, which was released in late 1972.

=== Lancer ===
Baker appeared in the pilot episode of 1968's Lancer, titled "The High Riders", as the main villain, "Day Pardee". This role was later fictionalized in Quentin Tarantino's 2019 film, Once Upon a Time in Hollywood—changed to 'Decoteau' and played by Leonardo DiCaprio as Rick Dalton. He went on to appear in a later episode as Clovis Horner in 1970.

=== Walking Tall and stardom ===
In 1973, Baker had his breakthrough playing sheriff Buford Pusser in the biographical vigilante action film Walking Tall, directed by Phil Karlson. Released in February as a regional exploitation picture, Walking Tall connected with audiences and became an unexpected hit, circulating for national distribution with a new TV ad campaign using the slogan, "When was the last time you stood up and applauded a movie?" The film eventually earned $23 million at the box office. His performance was praised by influential film critic Pauline Kael, but he decided not to star in the sequel.

Later that year, his work in Charley Varrick helped solidify Baker's reputation. He also co-starred with Robert Duvall in the 1973 crime film The Outfit.

He starred in the 1974 adventure film Golden Needles. In 1977, he had leading roles in Checkered Flag or Crash opposite Susan Sarandon and Larry Hagman as well as The Shadow of Chikara with Ted Neeley and Sondra Locke.

In 1975, he starred in Phil Karlson's Framed, the final film of Karlson's Hollywood career.

On April 10, 1978, the two-part television program To Kill a Cop premiered. In it Baker was paired with Louis Gossett Jr. as a police detective, Eischied, which led to a TV series with the same character the following year. Baker co-starred with Karen Black in the miniseries Power (1980), a scarcely-disguised story of labor leader Jimmy Hoffa.

Baker played the Whammer, a baseball player modeled on Babe Ruth, in the 1984 baseball drama The Natural, which starred Robert Redford. In 1985, he portrayed the corrupt Chief Jerry Karlin in Fletch. In the UK, he played CIA agent Darius Jedburgh in the BBC Television drama serial Edge of Darkness. He was nominated for Best Actor by the British Academy Television Awards, losing to his co-star Bob Peck. Martin Scorsese directed him as a private detective in the 1991 remake of Cape Fear, hired by protagonist Sam Bowden (Nick Nolte) to protect his family from psychopathic ex-convict Max Cady (Robert De Niro).

Baker received the Distinguished Alumni Award from the University of North Texas in 1994.

While actor Carroll O'Connor was undergoing coronary bypass surgery, Baker took his place on the television series In the Heat of the Night for four episodes in early 1989. Baker appeared as Captain Tom Dugan, a retired police captain who substituted while O'Connor's character was away at a police convention. More recently, he appeared in Joe Dirt, The Dukes of Hazzard, and Strange Wilderness.

In 2009, Baker delivered another performance in The Cleaner on A&E, playing an alcoholic military veteran attempting to help a friend cope with the loss of his son. He hires William Banks (played by Benjamin Bratt) to help him start back down the road to sobriety. Baker played King in Mud (2012).

=== James Bond series ===
In 1987, Baker played the villainous arms dealer Brad Whitaker in the James Bond film The Living Daylights, starring Timothy Dalton as 007. In 1995 and 1997, Baker returned to the series, this time playing a different character, CIA agent Jack Wade, in GoldenEye and Tomorrow Never Dies, with Pierce Brosnan as Bond.

== Death ==
Baker died of lung cancer at an assisted living facility in Los Angeles, on May 7, 2025, at the age of 89. He was buried at Oakwood Memorial Park Cemetery.

== Filmography ==
=== Film ===
Year	Title	Role	Notes
1967	Cool Hand Luke	Fixer	Uncredited
1969	Guns of the Magnificent Seven	Slater	
1970	Adam at Six A.M.	Harvey Gavin	
1971	Wild Rovers	Paul Buckman	
1971	Welcome Home Soldier Boys	Danny	
1972	Junior Bonner	Curly Bonner	
1972	The Valachi Papers	Mad Dog Coll	Uncredited
1973	Walking Tall	Buford Pusser	
1973	Charley Varrick	Molly	
1973	The Outfit	Jack Cody	
1974	Golden Needles	Dan Mason	
1975	Framed	Ron Lewis	
1975	Mitchell	Mitchell	Lampooned on the cult TV series Mystery Science Theater 3000
1977	Checkered Flag or Crash	Walkaway Madden	
1977	The Shadow of Chikara	Wishbone Cutter	
1977	Speedtrap	Pete Novick	
1977	The Pack	Jerry	
1982	Wacko	Dick Harbiger	
1983	Joysticks	Joseph Rutter	
1984	The Natural	The Whammer	
1984	Final Justice	Thomas Jefferson Geronimo III	Also lampooned on MST3K and RiffTrax
1985	Fletch	Chief Jerry Karlin	
1986	Getting Even	King R. Kenderson	
1987	The Living Daylights	Brad Whitaker	
1987	The Killing Time	Carl Cunningham	
1987	Leonard Part 6	Nick Snyderburn	
1988	Criminal Law	Detective Mesel	
1990	The Children	Cliffe Wheater	
1991	Cape Fear	Claude Kersek	
1992	The Distinguished Gentleman	Olaf Anderson	
1994	Ring of Steel	Man in Black	
1994	Reality Bites	Tom Pierce	
1994	Felony	Donovan	
1995	The Underneath	Hinkle	
1995	Panther	Brimmer	
1995	Congo	R.B. Travis	
1995	The Grass Harp	Sheriff Junius Candle	
1995	GoldenEye	Jack Wade	
1996	Mars Attacks!	Glenn Norris	
1997	Tomorrow Never Dies	Jack Wade	
2001	Vegas, City of Dreams	Dylan Garrett	
2001	Joe Dirt	Don	Uncredited
2003	The Commission	Hale Boggs	
2005	The Dukes of Hazzard	Governor Jim Applewhite	
2008	Strange Wilderness	Bill Calhoun	
2012	Mud	King	Final film role

=== Television ===
Year	Title	Role	Notes
1965	Honey West	Rocky Hansen	"Rockabye the Hard Way"
1965	Iron Horse	Johnson	"Cougar Man"
1967	Judd for the Defense	Merl Varney	"Shadow of a Killer"
1967	The Felony Squad	Shep Taubus	"My Mommy Got Lost"
1968	Bonanza	Luke Harper	"The Real People of Muddy Creek"
1968	The Outsider	Billy Joe Corey	"A Wide Place in the Road"
1966–1969	Gunsmoke	Woody Stoner / Tom Butler	2 episodes — "Prime of Life" (1966) — "Reprisal" (1969)
1968–1970	Lancer	Day Pardee / Santee / Clovis Horner	3 episodes — "The High Riders" (1968) — "Cut the Wolf Loose" (1969) — "Shadow of a Dead Man" (1970)
1969	The Big Valley	Tom Lightfoot	"Lightfoot"
1969	Mod Squad	Willie Turner	"Willie Poor Boy"
1970	Bracken's World	Nick Fontaine	"Focus on a Gun"
1970	The F.B.I.	Alex Drake	"Summer Terror"
1970	The Most Deadly Game	Alan	"Breakdown"
1971	The High Chaparral	Yuma	"The Hostage"
1971	Mission: Impossible	Frank Kearney	"The Miracle"
1971	Mongo's Back in Town	Mongo Nash	TV Movie
1972	Ironside	Eric Blair	"Camera... Action... Murder!"
1972	That Certain Summer	Phil Bonner	TV Movie
1973	Doc Elliot	Aaron Hickey	"Pilot"
1973	The Streets of San Francisco	Leonard Collier Cord	"Beyond Vengeance"
1978	To Kill a Cop	Chief Earl M. Eischied	TV Movie
1979–1980	Eischied	Chief Earl Eischied	series regular (13 episodes); also production consultant
1980	Power	Tommy Vanda	TV Movie; also production executive
1985	Edge of Darkness	Darius Jedburgh	Miniseries (6 episodes); Nominated – BAFTA TV Award for Best Actor
1987	The Abduction of Kari Swenson	Sheriff Onstad	TV Movie
1989	Screen Two	Hunter McCall	"Defrosting the Fridge"
1989	In the Heat of the Night	Tom Dugan / Acting Chief Tom Dugan	4 episodes — "Fifteen Forever" — "Ladybug, Ladybug" — "The Pig Woman of Sparta" — "Missing"
1992	Citizen Cohn	Senator Joseph McCarthy	TV Movie
1993	Complex of Fear	Detective Frank Farrel	TV Movie
1996	The Siege at Ruby Ridge	Gerry Spence	TV Movie
1997	To Dance with Olivia	Horace Henely	TV Movie
1997	George Wallace	Big Jim Folsom	Miniseries
1998	Poodle Springs	P.J. Parker	TV Movie
1999	Too Rich: The Secret Life of Doris Duke	Buck Duke	Miniseries
2009	The Cleaner	Major Larry Duren	"Last American Casualty"

== Theater ==
Year	Title	Role	Venue	Notes
1963–1964	Marathon '33	Mr. James	ANTA Playhouse	48 performances
1964	Blues for Mister Charlie	Ellis	ANTA Playhouse	148 performances Also understudy for multiple parts (Rev. Phelps, Judge, Court Stenographer)

== Awards and nominations ==
Award	Year	Category	Work	Result
British Academy Television Award	1986	Best Actor	Edge of Darkness	Nominated
CableACE Award	1997	Best Supporting Actor in a Movie or Miniseries	George Wallace	Nominated
Independent Spirit Award	2014	Robert Altman Award	Mud	Won
Satellite Award	1998	Best Supporting Actor – Series, Miniseries or Television Film	George Wallace	Nominated
