= The Heat of Ramadan =

1992 novel by Steven Hartov

- Author: Steven Hartov
- Genre: Espionage
- Published: 1992
- Publisher: Harcourt Brace Jovanovich
- Website: stevenhartov.com

The Heat of Ramadan is a novel by Steven Hartov, published by Harcourt Brace Jovanovich in 1992 and rereleased in 2015. It became the first in a trilogy of espionage tales featuring Israeli Military Intelligence agents Eytan Eckstein and Benni Baum. Hartov, an American-born author who served as an Israeli paratrooper, and later, an operative with AMAN (Israel Defense Forces Military Intelligence), devised the story based on historical events as well has his own experience.

Represented by literary agent Albert Zuckerman of Writers House, LLC, The Heat of Ramadan was sold to publishers Harcourt Brace Jovanovich in hard cover and St. Martin's Press in paperback. Hartov's debut novel earned praise from Publishers Weekly, Kirkus Reviews and other national newspapers, as well as top-ten placement in the Book of the Month Club and a nomination for the National Jewish Book Award. Its success resulted in a two-book contract with William Morrow for "The Nylon Hand of God" and "The Devil's Shepherd", completing the trilogy of Eckstein and Baum adventures. The novel was published in six foreign languages and made into a feature film, The Point Men starring Christopher Lambert and directed by Jon Glen.

== Plot ==
The book opens in Munich, with Eytan Eckstein and his team of Israeli agents on the hunt for master terrorist Amar Kamil. However, Eckstein makes a fatal mistake, killing the wrong man, and is himself badly wounded during the failed assassination. Thereafter, while relegated to a punitive desk job, Eckstein discovers that the members of his old team are being killed off, one-by-one. Benni Baum, his faithful commander, supports Eckstein's hunch that Amar Kamil is back in play, and the pair of renegade agents sets off to stop Kamil from committing a revenge assassination in Jerusalem that could engulf the Middle East in flames.

== Praise ==
Hartov's espionage novel is still considered an unparalleled inside look at the workings and culture of Israeli intelligence operations, earning Hartov praise as "Israel's John le Carré."

- "Hartov makes a smashing debut with this well-crafted, provocative political thriller, written with an insider's accuracy." – Publishers Weekly
- "A gripping, richly detailed, and impressive first novel. This is no techo-thriller concocted by some armchair generalissimo. This is the real stuff." - Jonathan Kellerman
- "Hartov knows his tradecraft and relates it expertly. A first-rate suspense story." – Chicago Tribune
- "One of the most compelling political action-thrillers I have ever read." – The Hollywood Reporter
