= Marklen Kennedy =

American actor

- Born: Houston, Texas, United States
- Education: Southern Methodist University
- Occupations: Producer, actor, executive
- Spouse: Carey Lessard
- Children: 2
- Website: campsite.bio/marklenkennedy/

Marklen Kennedy is an American actor, producer, film industry executive and founder of In Your Face Productions.

== Biography ==
Kennedy was born in Houston, Texas and raised in Plano, Texas. He graduated from Southern Methodist University in Dallas. He played college football and was named to an All Southwest Conference Football Team and was a player of interest to both the Dallas Cowboys and the Oakland Raiders until a motorcycle accident ended his football career. He then moved to Los Angeles where he worked regularly as an actor until the nightlife industry. He moved to Las Vegas in 2002 and continued to expand his career in nightlife as a Vice President for the Light Group and ran FOH for Bellagio's Light Nightclub, Caramel Lounge, Fix Restaurant, Mirage's Jet Nightclub, Stack Restaurant, Bare Pool and Director of Tao Groups’ Tao Beach before launching his career as a film and television producer. He resides in Dallas, TX with his wife, Actress and Model Carey Lessard, and their two children, Barbeque and Queso.

=== Professional life ===
Kennedy, was a producer for the History Channel's award-winning miniseries Texas Rising in 2015 and appeared in one episode of the series as Texas Ranger, Zacharias Coffey. He is the owner and executive producer of In Your Face Productions and is the creator and executive producer of several series including Showtime's Gigolos which he produced with Richard Grieco, FYI Networks Late Nite Chef Fight Lifetime's Postmortem in Vegas and FOX TV's Labor of Love. Kennedy has been a recurring character on Pawn Stars, and appeared in Melrose Place, and CSI: Crime Scene Investigation. He appeared on Lifetime’s series Vivica A. Fox’s Black Magic, which premiered in January 2017.

Kennedy, in addition to being a Producer, is an Ordained Universal Life Church Minister, who officiated the wedding ceremony of actor Corey Feldman and wife Courtney Anne in November 2016. Kennedy conducted the ceremony at Elton John's Fizz champagne lounge at Caesars Palace in Las Vegas.

Kennedy, who appears in and produced the movie Cops & Robbers released in 2016, produced the movie Female Fight Club appeared and produced the movie Fright Fest and produced the film Bruja in Mexico with MMA legend turned actor Randy Couture. In addition to his hit series Gigolos, Kennedy has produced Late Night Chef Fight and Trailer Park Housewives.

Billy F Gibbons from ZZ Top is his son's Godfather. Rock and Roll Hall of Famer, Billy Gibbons, made a surprise appearance inside a Texas elementary classroom to read for a stunned group of 2nd-graders.

== Filmography ==
Year	Title	Executive Producer	Producer	Actor	Role	Notes
2021	SMU Football: The Hilltop			Yes	Marklen Kennedy	TV series
2019	Diamonds in the Sky		Yes			Movie
2017	Cops and Robbers		Yes	Yes	Shakers	Movie
2017	Knuckles		Yes			Movie
2017	Treasure Hunter: Legend of the White Witch	Yes				Movie
2017	Dead trigger		Yes			Movie
2018	Fright fest		Yes	Yes	Grapefruit	Movie
2017	Vivica's Black Magic		Yes	Yes	Marklen Kennedy	TV series
2018	Kinky			Yes	Dr. Weiss	Movie
2016	Female Fight Squad	Yes	Yes	Yes	Carl	Movie
2016	Gigolos	Yes	Yes			TV series
2015	Late Nite Chef Fight	Yes		Yes	Foodie	TV series
2015	Texas Rising		Yes	Yes	Zacharias	TV mini-series
2015	Avenging the Alamo: The Road to Texas Rising		Yes			TV movie documentary
2014	Back of the House Brawls	Yes				TV series
2014	Postmortem in Las Vegas	Yes		Yes	John Doe	TV movie
2014	Vegas DOA	Yes				TV movie
2012	Vegas Moms	Yes				TV movie
2010	CSI: Crime Scene Investigation			Yes	Pool Manager	TV series
2001	As the World Turns			Yes	Billy	TV series
2001	Urban Legends: Cyber			Yes	Bill	TV series
2001	Girl for Girl			Yes	Ben	Movie
2000	Everybody Loves a Star			Yes	Cameron Hunter / Tim	Movie
1999	Penny Dreadfuls	Yes		Yes	Sonny	Movie
1999	Ryan Caulfield: Year One			Yes	Stockbroker	TV series
1999	Melrose Place			Yes	Bartender Manager	TV series
1999	Santa's Little Helper			Yes	Steve Wilder	Short
1998	The Glass Box			Yes	Ray	Movie
1998	Perfect Prey			Yes	Investigator Lyons	TV movie
1998	Heaven or Vegas			Yes	Donald	Movie
1997	Women: Stories of Passion			Yes	Sean	TV series
1997	Pacific Palisades			Yes	Adam Bentley	TV series
1997	Magenta			Yes	Craig	Movie
1996	Backroads to Vegas			Yes	William	TV movie
1994	On Deadly Ground			Yes	Villager	Movie
1994	A.P.E.X.			Yes	Apex Robot	Movie
1993	The Secret Life: Jeffrey Dahmer			Yes	Victim	Movie
1993	Witchcraft V: Dance with the Devil			Yes	William	Video
1992	Ring of the Musketeers			Yes	Officer Rigs	TV movie
1991	Necessary Roughness			Yes	Football Player	Movie
