= Bond Girls Are Forever =

2002 documentary film by Maryam d'Abo

- DVD cover
- Starring: Maryam d'Abo, Halle Berry, Ursula Andress, Honor Blackman, Luciana Paluzzi, Jill St. John, Jane Seymour, Maud Adams, Lois Chiles, Carey Lowell, Michelle Yeoh, Judi Dench, Samantha Bond, Rosamund Pike
- Country of origin: United States
- Original language: English

Production
- Producer: Maryam d'Abo
- Cinematography: Brian Pratt
- Editors: Kevin Bourque, Harry Watson
- Running time: 46 minutes
- Production companies: Planet Grande Pictures, Metro-Goldwyn-Mayer

Original release
- Release: November 6, 2002

Bond Girls Are Forever
- Boxtree British hardcover edition
- Author: John Cork; Maryam d'Abo
- Language: English
- Series: James Bond
- Publisher: Boxtree Ltd.
- Publication date: 2002 (Documentary); 2003 (Book)
- Publication place: United Kingdom
- Media type: Print (Hardcover); TV film
- Pages: 192 pp.
- ISBN: 0-7522-1550-7
- OCLC: 52785338

Bond Girls Are Forever is a 2002 James Bond documentary film hosted by actress Maryam d'Abo, who played the role of Kara Milovy in the 15th James Bond film The Living Daylights (1987). The film was accompanied by a 2003 book written by John Cork and d'Abo, Bond Girls Are Forever: The Women of James Bond. The film and the book are tributes to the elite club of women who have played the role of a Bond girl.

The TV film, which was released in November 2002 alongside Die Another Day, features interviews with a number of Bond girls who were featured throughout the film franchise between the first James Bond film, Dr. No (1962) starring Ursula Andress and the then-current 20th film Die Another Day starring Halle Berry. In 2003, the documentary was released on DVD and offered as a gift with the purchase of Die Another Day on DVD by some retailers.

In 2006, a new version of the documentary, updated to include interviews with cast from Casino Royale and edited to include commercial breaks, was produced for the AMC network and was later released as a bonus feature on the March 2007 DVD and Blu-ray editions of Casino Royale.

A new 2012 version was shown on the Sky Movies 007 channel in the UK to include Quantum of Solace (2008) and Skyfall (2012).

Emmy Award–winning singer and songwriter Faith Rivera performed a rendition of "Nobody Does It Better" over the closing credits of the documentary.

== Bond girls interviewed in order ==
- Halle Berry
- Ursula Andress
- Honor Blackman
- Luciana Paluzzi
- Jill St. John
- Jane Seymour
- Maud Adams
- Lois Chiles
- Carey Lowell
- Michelle Yeoh
- Judi Dench
- Samantha Bond
- Rosamund Pike
- Eva Green (2006 version)
- Caterina Murino (2006 version)
- Gemma Arterton (2008 version)
- Naomie Harris (2012 version)
- Bérénice Marlohe (2012 version)
