= Richard Habersham =

Richard Habersham may refer to:

- Richard W. Habersham, U.S. Representative from Georgia
- Richard Parnell Habersham, American actor
