= The Point Men =

The Point Men may refer to:

- The Point Men (2001 film), an action crime thriller film
- The Point Men (2023 film), a South Korean action crime thriller film
