= Steven Hartov =

- Born: May 7, 1953 (age 73); New London, Connecticut
- Education: Boston University
- Notable work: The Heat of Ramadan, The Nylon Hand of God, The Devil's Shepherd and In the Company of Heroes
- Website: stevenhartov.com

Steven Hartov (born May 7, 1953) is an American-Israeli author of fiction and non-fiction works, journalist, screenwriter, lecturer in international security affairs and former Editor-in-Chief of "Special Operations Report". His works are recommended readings by the U.S. Army War College.

Hartov's works include the Israeli espionage trilogy, The Heat of Ramadan, The Nylon Hand of God and The Devil's Shepherd. His non-fiction works include the New York Times bestseller, In the Company of Heroes, co-authored with Michael J. Durant, The Night Stalkers, co-authored with Michael J. Durant and Lt. Col. (ret) Robert L. Johnson, and Afghanistan on the Bounce, co-authored with Robert L. Cunningham. He contributed to the books American Warrior and Great Raids in History.

His magazine work includes articles for The Journal of International Security, Gear Magazine, Maxim, Playboy, Reader's Digest, The Standard and Sudeutche Gezeitung. As a screenwriter, Hartov penned Mercenary starring John Ritter and Robert Culp, Mars starring Olivier Gruner and Shari Belafonte, Acts of Betrayal starring María Conchita Alonso, and Thick and Thin starring Sam Bottoms. His novel, The Heat of Ramadan was adapted for the feature film, The Point Men, starring Christopher Lambert. He served as technical advisor for the television documentary series Counter Force and has appeared as a guest on CNN, FOX, XM Sirius Radio, CNBC, and America's Book of Secrets. For six years, he served as editor-in-chief of Special Operations Report, a quarterly publication about elite military and law enforcement units.

== Early life ==
Hartov was born in New London, Connecticut, the child of an Austrian Holocaust refugee (mother) and a WWII veteran and musician (father). He attended public schools in New England and earned a scholarship to Boston University's School of Fine Arts.

== Military ==
In 1973, Hartov took leave from his studies at Boston University to join the US Merchant Marine/Military Sealift Command, serving aboard an oiler-refueler from South America to the Middle East, where he remained in Israel during the Yom Kippur War. He completed his BFA at BU in 1976, returned to Israel and volunteered for the Israel Defense Force (IDF) paratroopers, participating in "Operation Light" and "Operation Litani." He was then recruited into the IDF's military intelligence service (AMAN), saw action again in 1983-1984 during "Operation Peace for Galilee," and served twelve more years as an IDF reserve Pathfinder and liaison between the IDF parachute school and foreign airborne organizations. In 2004, residing again in the United States, Hartov was recruited into the New York Guard. He currently holds the rank of Major and is attached to Task Force 105, 56th BDE, NYG.

== Writing ==
Hartov, who claims diverse influences such as Ernest Hemingway and John LeCarre, began his writing career in the mid-1980s, penning an epic war novel "Wishes for a Small War" (unpublished) and securing the interest of Albert Zuckerman, legendary literary agent and president of Writers House LLC. Hartov then returned to Jerusalem and wrote "The Heat of Ramadan," the first of his trilogy featuring Israeli Intelligence agents Eytan Eckstein and Benni Baum, who remain favorite protagonists of the genre. Hartov's first novel was published by Harcourt Brace Jovanovich, the remaining parts of the trilogy published by William Morrow. His non-fiction works have been published by Putnam/Penguin and Insight Editions. His books have been translated into six foreign languages and gained exceptional reviews from Publishers Weekly, Kirkus Reviews, The Chicago Tribune, Hollywood Reporter and numerous other publications.

Hartov's work, The Soul of a Thief, a novel about World War II, was released by HarperCollins/Harlequin under the Hanover Square Press imprint in 2018.

In 2022, Hartov, a resident of Teaneck, New Jersey, released The Last of the Seven, a historical novel about a Jewish commandos team set during World War II.
