= Mutual Needs =

1997 film

- Directed by: Robert Angelo
- Produced by: Marc L. Greenberg; Marc Laurence
- Starring: Eric Scott Woods; Tricia Lee Pascoe; Karl Bury; Laura Rogers; Rochelle Swanson; Sydney Coale; Kimberly Kelley; David Andriole; Richard Grieco; Charlotte Lewis; Dee Wallace; Christopher Atkins; Kristen Williams; Karen Moore
- Cinematography: Carl Oakwood
- Edited by: Ivan Ladizinsky
- Music by: Bill Rogers
- Release date: 1997
- Running time: 87 min.
- Country: United States
- Language: English

Mutual Needs is a 1997 American erotic thriller drama film directed by Robert Angelo. The film's music was composed by Bill Rogers. The film stars Eric Scott Woods, Tricia Lee Pascoe, Karl Bury, Laura Rogers, Rochelle Swanson and Kimberly Kelley in the lead roles.

== Plot ==
Michael is a manager at an accounting firm and his girlfriend has just dumped him. He has a ten year high school class reunion coming up and he doesn't want to go alone, so he hires Charlene through an escort service to accompany him as his girlfriend. However, Charlene has an agenda of her own - she's perturbed that her acting career never materialized because of Hollywood executives failing to recognize her acting skills, so she's out for revenge against all men.

== Cast ==
- Eric Scott Woods as Michael
- Tricia Lee Pascoe as Sandra
- Karl Bury as Pete
- Laura Rogers as Helen
- Rochelle Swanson as Charlene
- Sydney Coale as Josie
- Kimberly Kelley as Kelly
- David Andriole as Bartender
- Richard Grieco as Brandon Collier
- Charlotte Lewis as Louise Collier
- Dee Wallace as Patricia
- Christopher Atkins as Andrew
- Kristen Williams as Kimberly
- Karen Moore as Rita
