= Natalie Radford =

Canadian actress (born 1966)

- Born: June 24, 1966 (age 59); Canada
- Occupation: Actress
- Years active: 1992-present

Natalie Radford (born 24 June 1966) is a Canadian actress. She has acted in various television shows and movies, including Darcy's Wild Life and Jewel.

== Filmography ==
=== Film ===
Year	Title	Role	Notes
1993	Tomcat: Dangerous Desires	Imogen	
1994	Operation Golden Phoenix	Anne	
1995	Memory Run	Alice	Video
1999	Kate's Addiction	Zoey	
1999	Superstar	Autumn Winters	
2000	Agent Red	Nadia	
2005	The Life and Times of Guy Terrifico	Mary Lou Griffiths	
2005	Love Is Work	Zoe	
2010	Sophie & Sheba	Abby Collins	
2012	Hiding	Debbie Kellerman	Video
2013	And Now a Word from Our Sponsor	Susan	
2013	Cas and Dylan	Susan Crosby	
2014	The Calling	Glynnis Pederson	
2016	Deadly Voltage	Bailey's Mom	

=== Television ===
Year	Title	Role	Notes
1992	Beyond Reality	Ellie	"Master of Darkness"
1992	Forever Knight	Ilsa	"Dead Issue"
1993	J.F.K.: Reckless Youth	Rosemary Kennedy	TV miniseries
1993	Rapture	Diane	TV film
1993	The Hidden Room	Tina	"My Sister's Keeper"
1994	Are You Afraid of the Dark?	Belinda	"The Tale of the Bookish Babysitter"
1994	E.N.G.	Susan Prentiss	"Cutting Edge"
1994	Sodbusters	Young Becky	TV film
1994	Forever Knight	Celeste	"A Fate Worse Than Death"
1994	Spenser: The Judas Goat	Cloris Caldwell	TV film
1994	Due South	Louise Webber	"A Cop, a Mountie, and a Baby"
1994–95	Kung Fu: The Legend Continues	Karen	"May I Ride with You", "May I Walk with You"
1994–1996	TekWar	Nika	Main role (season 2)
1995	The Android Affair	Rachel Tyler	TV film
1995	Harrison Bergeron	Alma Starbuck	TV film
1996	My Life as a Dog	Cathy Hicks / Courtney Vine	"Soap Gets in Your Eyes"
1996	Kung Fu: The Legend Continues	Meg	"Blackout"
1998	Pacific Blue	Gina Karnow	"House Party"
1998	F/X: The Series	Jennifer Elliott	"Standoff"
1998	Life of the Party: The Pamela Harriman Story	Pamela Harriman (age 20)	TV film
1998	Sliders	Christina Griffin	"Mother and Child"
1999	Crime in Connecticut: The Story of Alex Kelly	Anna Carlsson	TV film
1999	Killing Moon	Teri Sands	TV film
1999	P.T. Barnum	Young Charity	TV film
1999	Twice in a Lifetime	Young Eloise Hawke	"School's Out"
2000	Twice in a Lifetime	Young Mindy Posey	"War of the Poseys"
2000	The Chippendales Murder	Irene	TV film
2001	The X-Files	Marie Hangemuhl	"The Gift"
2001	Jewel	Raylene Hilburn (age 22–30)	TV film
2001–02	Blue Murder	Carolyn Pogue	"Family Man", "Spankdaddy"
2002	Doc	Mary Campbell	"My Secret Identity"
2002	Fitzgerald	Sheilah Graham	TV film
2004–2006	Darcy's Wild Life	Victoria Fields	Main role
2005	The Eleventh Hour	Marlowe Huber	"Das Bootcamp"
2008	Murdoch Mysteries	Daisy Hanson	"'Til Death Do Us Part"
2008	Anne of Green Gables: A New Beginning	Bertha Shirley	TV film
2011	What's Up Warthogs!	Uta	"And That's What's Up"
2012	Frenemies	Jacqueline Reynolds	TV film
2014	Saving Hope	Claire	"Twinned Lambs"
