= Maryam d'Abo =

British actress (born 1960)

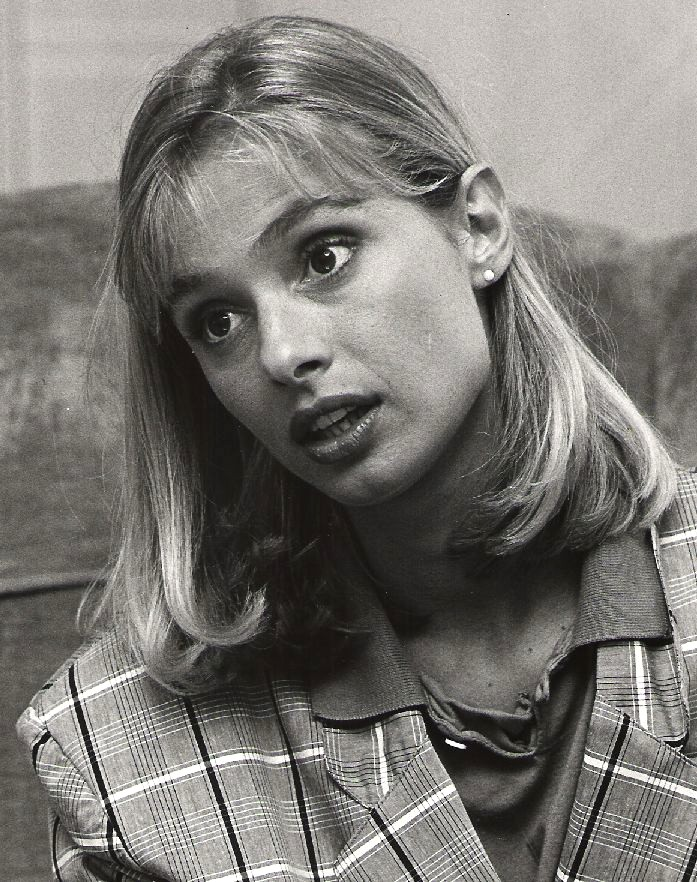
- D'Abo in 1987
- Born: 27 December 1960 (age 65); Hammersmith, London, England
- Occupation: Actress
- Years active: 1982–present
- Spouse: Hugh Hudson (m. 2003; died 2023)
- Relatives: Giorgi Kvinitadze (grandfather); Mike d'Abo (first cousin); Olivia d'Abo (first cousin once removed)

Maryam d'Abo (born 27 December 1960) is a British actress, best known as Bond girl Kara Milovy in the 1987 James Bond film The Living Daylights.

== Early life ==
She was born in London to Georgian mother Nino Kvinitadze, daughter of General Giorgi Kvinitadze, and Anglo-Dutch father Peter Claude Holland d'Abo, of a landed gentry family of West Wratting, Cambridgeshire. Maryam d'Abo was raised in Paris and Geneva.

D’Abo was drawing from the age of eight, but by 13 she wanted to become an actress; she joined an amateur theatre company while at school in Geneva. She decided to do a foundation course at the London College of Printing at 18, but she abandoned those studies in order to go to drama school at Drama Centre London. She left after one term in order to make her film debut.

== Career ==
D'Abo made her screen debut in the low-budget science fiction horror film Xtro (1982), playing Analise Mercier, a French au pair, who becomes a human incubator for an alien. She appeared in the film Until September (1984) and had small roles in television mini-series based on Sidney Sheldon's novels Master of the Game (1984) and If Tomorrow Comes. She also appeared in Oscar winner Taylor Hackford's film White Nights (1985) and in an uncredited role as a woman pouring champagne to Klaus Maria Brandauer at a hunting party in the Oscar winning Out of Africa (1985), directed by Oscar winner Sydney Pollack. Other credits include Arthur the King (1985).

She worked on the French stage in Lyon playing Varinia in Spartacus directed by Jacques Weber in 1981, played Roxane in Cyrano de Bergerac at the Grenier de Toulouse in 1982, then worked in a 1987 French TV movie, Les Idiots (The Idiots), written by Gérard Brach, with Jean Carmet and Jean-Pierre Marielle.

D'Abo had a starring role in The Living Daylights (1987) as Kara Milovy, the sweet and vulnerable Czechoslovak cellist and would-be sniper who falls for James Bond. As a tie-in with the film, she also appeared in a Bond-themed Playboy cover and multi-page pictorial in the September 1987 issue, but later said in an interview with People magazine that "I wouldn't do those pictures now... I've learned a lot since then".

She featured in the music video to the 1987 single 'So the Story Goes' by British band Living in a Box.

On television, d'Abo played Ta'Ra, an alien medical officer in the science fiction miniseries Something Is Out There (1988), which was followed by a six-episode NBC mini-series of the same name, and she played Anne Summerton in the TV adaptation of Jeffrey Archer's novel Not a Penny More, Not a Penny Less (1990) directed by Clive Donner.

D'Abo had a supporting role as a pretentious stained-glass artist in the low-budget British comedy Leon the Pig Farmer (1992). She appeared in the 1994 film The Browning Version and starred in Timelock (1996).

D'Abo has had roles in various low-budget, straight-to-video action, horror and fantasy films such as Tomcat: Dangerous Desires (1992), as well as guest roles on television shows Tales from the Crypt (1993), Red Shoe Diaries (1992) and Murder, She Wrote (1992).

She reunited with her James Bond director John Glen for a guest-starring role on the television series Space Precinct and for the feature film The Point Men (2001). Glen later said that he cast her in three different projects was because she was one of his favourite actresses. She played the mother of Lara (played by Keira Knightley) in the television miniseries version of Doctor Zhivago (2002), and she was Queen Hecuba in the Emmy-nominated miniseries Helen of Troy (2003). She had a small role in the French film L'Enfer (Hell, 2005), directed by Danis Tanovic whose stars included fellow Bond Girl Carole Bouquet.

D'Abo and John Cork wrote the book Bond Girls Are Forever, published in 2002, which is a tribute to the women who have played the role of a Bond girl. It was inspired by the documentary Bond Girls Are Forever, which she produced with Planetgrande, featuring d'Abo and other Bond girls, including Ursula Andress, Honor Blackman, Jill St. John, Maud Adams, Lois Chiles, Judi Dench, Rosamund Pike, Eva Green, Halle Berry, and Carey Lowell. The documentary appeared on the American AMC network in 2002, timed to coincide with the theatrical release of Die Another Day. It was later included as a gift with the purchase of Die Another Day on DVD by some retailers. In 2006, a new version of the documentary, updated to include interviews with cast from Casino Royale (2006) was again aired on the AMC network and later released as a bonus feature on the March 2007 Blu-ray disc and DVD release of Casino Royale.

In 2004 she wrote and, with Cabin Creek Films, co-produced the documentary film Bearing Witness, about five female war reporters featuring Marie Colvin and Janine di Giovanni, which Barbara Kopple and Marijana Wotton directed for A&E. The feature documentary premiered at the Tribeca Film Festival.

In 2007, she had surgery for a brain hemorrhage; after recovering, she was inspired to meet other people who had similar experiences. She then worked on and produced a 2011 documentary on the topic titled Rupture: A Matter of Life and Death.

In 2009, she had a supporting role in the British period fantasy-thriller Dorian Gray. She appeared in the 2014 Indian film Tigers directed by Danis Tanovic, and made her return to the horror genre in 2025 with the British film The Baby in the Basket.

D'Abo is signed to Models 1. In 2015, she modelled for fashion retailer JD Williams' AW 15 collection that includes clothing for women in their 50s.

== Personal life ==
D'Abo is the first cousin of Mike d'Abo, a singer and member of 1960s group Manfred Mann. This makes her first cousin once removed of actress Olivia d'Abo. Maryam and Olivia once lived in Los Angeles, buying a house together in 1988, after Olivia turned 19.

D'Abo is the granddaughter (on her mother's side) of the anti-communist Georgian general Giorgi Kvinitadze.

In November 2003, D'Abo married Hugh Hudson, the Oscar-nominated British director of Chariots of Fire (1981). They remained married until his death on 10 February 2023.

In 2007, D'Abo had surgery for a brain haemorrhage from which she recovered.

== Filmography ==
Year	Title	Role	Notes
1982	Xtro	Analise Mercier	
1984	Master of the Game	Dominique Masson	Television miniseries
1984	Until September	Nathalie	
1985	Arthur the King	2nd Court Lady	Television film
1985	White Nights	French Girlfriend	
1985	Out of Africa	Lady pouring champagne at a hunting party	Uncredited
1985	Behind Enemy Lines	Claudie DeBrille	Television film
1986	If Tomorrow Comes	Solange	Miniseries
1987	The Living Daylights	Kara Milovy	
1988	Something Is Out There	Ta'Ra	Television series, Main role
1989	Nightlife	Angelique	Television film, Main role
1990	Not a Penny More, Not a Penny Less	Anne Summerton	Television film
1990	Money	Sarah Wilkins	
1991	Immortal Sins	Susan	
1992	Murder, She Wrote	Barbara Calloway	Television series, episode: "The Monte Carlo Murders"
1992	Leon the Pig Farmer	Madeleine	
1992	Double Obsession	Claire Burke	Filmed in Boulder. Distributed by Tri-Star. Directed by Eduardo Montes-Bradley
1992	Red Shoe Diaries	Zoe	Television series, episode: "Another Woman's Lipstick"
1993	Shootfighter: Fight to the Death	Cheryl Walker	
1993	Tropical Heat	Beverly	
1993	Tomcat: Dangerous Desires	Jacki	
1994	The Browning Version	Diana	
1994	Stalked	Brooke Daniels	
1994	Solitaire for 2	Caroline	
1995	Savage Hearts	Beatrice Baxter	
1996	Timelock	Teegs	
1997	So This Is Romance?	Sarah II	
1997	An American Affair	Geneveve	
1998	The Sea Change	Alison	
1998	Mowgli: The New Adventures of the Jungle Book	Elaine Bendel	Television series, 3 episodes
2001	The Point Men	Francie Koln	
2002	Doctor Zhivago	Amalia Guishar	Television miniseries
2002/2006/2012	Bond Girls Are Forever	Herself (Host)/Kara Milovy (Archive Footage)	DVD release of Casino Royale (2007). 2 Disc Version/ITV (2012)
2003	Helen of Troy	Queen Hecuba	Television miniseries
2004	Trespassing	Linda Bryce	
2004	San-Antonio	Margaux	
2005	Hell	Julie	Original title: L'enfer
2006	The Prince & Me II: The Royal Wedding	Queen Rosalind	Direct-to-video
2007	Doctor Who: Frozen Time	Genevieve	Audio drama
2009	Dorian Gray	Gladys	
2012	Thirteen Steps Down	Madame Odette	Television miniseries
2014	Tigers	Maggie	
2015	X Company	Madame Sournis	Television series, episode: "Kiss of Death"
2016	Altamira	Elena	
2019	Pandora	Maya Fleming	Television series, episode: "Time Out of Mind"
2020	Last Words		
2025	The Baby in the Basket	Mother Superior	
