= Timelock (film) =

- Directed by: Robert Munic
- Starring: Maryam d'Abo, Arye Gross, Jeffrey Meek, Ricco Ross, Jeff Speakman
- Edited by: Amanda I. Kirpaul
- Music by: Marco Marinangeli
- Release date: 1996
- Country: United States

Timelock is a science fiction film of 1996 directed by Robert Munic, starring Maryam d'Abo.

== Outline ==
The film is set in another galaxy in the year 2251. Dangerous criminals from Earth are kept at Alpha 4, a penal colony on an asteroid, in cryonic suspension. There is chaos when the computer system is hit with a virus, and the men in storage wake up and gain control of the complex, led by McMasters (Jeff Speakman). He plans a break-out, hiring the co-pilot of the prison transport shuttle and planning to kill its captain, Jessie Teegs (Maryam d'Abo). However, she proves hard to kill and teams up with a petty thief and computer hacker, Riley (Arye Gross), who has been delivered to Alpha 4 by mistake, to fight McMasters for survival. After Wilson is killed in a random act of violence by one of the inmates, McMasters needs Teegs as a pilot and captures her, trying to force her to fly the ship out for him. There is a complication because the ship can't fly without a program stored on a disk which is missing. However, Riley rescues Teegs, they find the disk, and escape with the shuttle, leaving the convicts with no way out.

== Cast ==
- Maryam d'Abo as Captain Jessie Teegs
- Arye Gross as Riley
- Jeffrey Meek as Williams
- Ricco Ross as Tibock
- Jeff Speakman as McMasters
- Thomas G. Waites as Warden Andrews
- Nicholas Worth as Sullivan
- Joey Dedio as Larden
- Martin Kove as Admiral Danny Teegs
- Phillip Brock as Prisoner
- Ira Heiden as Dr Teller
- Shon Greenblatt as Snapper
- Juan Pope (J. Lamont Pope) as Wilson
- Tom Billett as Neville
- Andrew James Jones as Ensign
- Patrick Malone as Computer Tech
- Cheryl Bartel as Clarissa
- Jon Bascoe as Ali
- Kyle Reed as Inmate
- Kirk Pynchon as Lieutenant
- Roadblock Martin as Barber
