= Texas Rising =

2015 American TV miniseries

- Promotional poster
- Genre: Western
- Written by: Leslie Greif; Darrell Fetty; George Nihil
- Directed by: Roland Joffé
- Starring: Bill Paxton; Jeffrey Dean Morgan; Olivier Martinez; Thomas Jane; Crispin Glover; Jeremy Davies; Rhys Coiro; Christopher McDonald; John Elvis; Max Thieriot; Cynthia Addai-Robinson; Robert Knepper; Chad Michael Murray; Jeff Fahey; Sarah Jones; Joe Egender; Robert Baker; Marklen Kennedy; Stephen Monroe Taylor; Trevor Donovan; Rob Morrow; Kris Kristofferson; Brendan Fraser; Ray Liotta
- Music by: Bruce Broughton; John Debney
- Country of origin: United States
- Original language: English
- No. of episodes: 5

Production
- Executive producer: Leslie Greif
- Producers: Roland Joffé; Batán Silva; Joanne Rubino; Herb Nanas; Darrell Fetty
- Cinematography: Arthur Reinhart
- Editor: Don Cassidy
- Running time: 600 minutes
- Production companies: A+E Studios; ITV Studios America; ThinkFactory Media

Original release
- Network: History
- Release: May 25 – June 15, 2015

Texas Rising is a 2015 television miniseries based on the Texas Revolution against Mexico and how the Texas Rangers were created. It was directed by Roland Joffé and premiered on May 25, 2015 on the History Channel. The series stars Bill Paxton, Jeffrey Dean Morgan, Ray Liotta, Brendan Fraser, Olivier Martinez and Cynthia Addai-Robinson.

== Premise ==
Opening Introduction: (narrator):

1836—Republic of Texas. The Mexican territory is home to thousands of U.S. settlers. Tensions rise as Comanche and Karankawa fight to keep their lands. Outlaws roam free, and slaves are caught in the crossfire. Mexican General Santa Anna battles to reclaim the land. U.S. President Andrew Jackson is hesitant to intervene and Texas has no choice but to declare itself an independent nation. Outnumbered, General Sam Houston's Texas Republic Army and Steve Austin's Ranging Company are all that stand between Santa Anna's tyranny and independence. Texas in flames; the Alamo in ashes. Pioneers, Mexicans, Tejanos, Indians, Soldiers, have no choice ... fight or die!

Unlike most films or television series that focus on the Texas Revolution, Texas Rising does not center on the Battle of the Alamo and starts after its fall. The series focuses on General Sam Houston and the Texan Army as Santa Anna marches eastward to face finish off the Texans. Battles shown include the Goliad Massacre and the Battle of San Jacinto. There is also special focus on a company of Texas Rangers under Deaf Smith and Henry Karnes who serve as scouts for Sam Houston.

== Production ==
Filming began around June 2014 in Durango, Mexico. The series is from A+E Studios and ITV Studios America, produced by Thinkfactory Media with Leslie Greif as executive producer. Actor Jeffrey Dean Morgan ate a can of tuna a day to lose 40 pounds for his role as Deaf Smith.

== Release ==
The first teaser trailer was released on January 25, 2015, during Sons of Liberty, which revealed a "Memorial Day" release date and featured the tagline, "The Alamo wasn't the end. It was the beginning."

The series premiered in Australia on 19 August 2015 on FX Australia.

== Cast ==
=== Texas Revolution ===
Actor	Character
Bill Paxton	General Sam Houston
Olivier Martinez	General Antonio Lopez de Santa Anna
Jeffrey Dean Morgan	Captain Deaf Smith
Cynthia Addai-Robinson	Emily D. West
Crispin Glover	Captain Moseley Baker
Darby Hinton	President David G. Burnet
Alixandra von Renner	Susanna Dickinson
Rob Morrow	Colonel James Fannin
Geoffrey Blake	Colonel George Hockley
Kris Kristofferson	President Andrew Jackson
Christopher McDonald	Henry Karnes
Chad Michael Murray	Colonel Mirabeau Lamar
Jeff Fahey	Secretary of War Thomas Rusk
Raúl Méndez	Colonel Juan Seguín
Johnathon Schaech	Colonel Sidney Sherman
Alejandro Bracho	General José Urrea
Antonio de la Vega	General Juan Almonte

=== Texas Rangers ===
Actor	Character
Max Thieriot	Jack Hays
Marklen Kennedy	Zacharias Coffey
Robert Baker	William "Bigfoot" Wallace
Brendan Fraser	Billy Anderson
Trevor Donovan	Kit Acklin
Rhys Coiro	Vern Elwood
Joe Egender	"Beans" Wilkins
Stephen Taylor	"Gator" Davis
Jeremy Davies	Private Ephraim Knowles

=== Other main characters ===
Actor	Character
Ray Liotta	Lorca / Tom Mitchell
Horacio Garcia Rojas	Buffalo Hump
Adam Hicks	Truett Fincham
Jake Busey	Samuel Wallace
Thomas Jane	James Wykoff
Sarah Jones	Pauline Wykoff
Molly McMichael	Rebecca Pitt
Jacob Lofland	Colby Pitt
Olga Segura	Concepcion
James Paxton	Roy
Courtney Gains	Cole Hornfischer
Gerardo Taracena	Manuel N. Flores
Robert Knepper	Empresario Buckley
Darrell Fetty	Doc Ewing

=== Recurring characters ===
Actor	Character
Dillon Lane	Yancey Burns
Harold Torres	Colonel Portilla
Vico Escorcia	Sarah Ewing
Samuel French	Gavin McDonough
John Elvis	Yellow Knife
Marklen Kennedy	Zacharias
Amen Igbinosun	Nate
Madelyn Deutch	Curls
Harding Junior	Jupiter
Felipe de Lara	Francisco
Daniel K. Walker	"Fuzz"
Taylor Brock	Ruthie
Bill Millsap	Raw-Boned Drunk

== Episodes ==
No.	Title	Directed by	Written by	Original release date	U.S. viewers (millions)
1	"From the Ashes"	Roland Joffé	Leslie Greif & Darrell Fetty and George Nihil	May 25, 2015	4.08
The day after the brutal defeat and executions at The Alamo on March 7, 1836, lone survivors, Emily D. West and Susana Dickenson journey to Texas Republic Army camp in Gonzalez with the help of the newly named Texas Rangers who battle Karankawa Indians along the way. Meanwhile, at the outpost, the Texas Revolution is in full swing under General Sam Houston's command. After hearing of the grave news, he and his Texian troops want revenge against General Santa Anna and his mighty Mexican army. But in order to fight another day, they must retreat and abandon their stronghold in Goliad and join forces in Victoria, much to the stubbornness of Colonel Fannin, who doesn't want to follow orders. Also, soon-to-be-famous rangers Jack Hays and Bigfoot Wallace meet for the first time in Nacogdoches and ride to Fort Defiance to fight.
2	"Fate and Fury"	Roland Joffé	Story by : Leslie Greif & Darrell Fetty and George Nihil; Teleplay by : Leslie Greif & Darrell Fetty	May 26, 2015	3.39
Colonel Fannin finally retreats from Fort Defiance, but faces overwhelming odds when he and his troops are ambushed by General Urrea, who assures him mercy for his men if they surrender. However, after the decision to become prisoners, the Battle of Coleto Creek proves costly for the Texians when they are brought back to their fort and are all massacred on Colonel Portilla's command. Meanwhile, Emily plays spy and gets close to Santa Anna to learn his secrets. Also, Hays and Wallace are on the trail of robbers who stole their belongings, and wind up at Goliad where Bigfoot's brother Samuel died. Later, Houston teams up with the rangers and encounters Comanches and the lunatic Lorca, who after witnessing the aftermath, slays the remaining Mexicans. Back at camp, Officers Baker and Sherman rile up the soldiers against their general to "stand and fight", but Houston asks them to follow him east where victory awaits.
3	"Blood for Blood"	Roland Joffé	Story by : Leslie Greif & Darrell Fetty and George Nihil; Teleplay by : Leslie Greif & Darrell Fetty	June 1, 2015	3.04
Despite Houston's leadership still being under question by his officers, he marches his troops south outside Harrisburg to prepare for engagement with Santa Anna and his army in a final battle in San Jacinto. But Colonel Sherman defies orders and sends his cavalry in to fight, which almost costs them the war. Meanwhile, after purchasing farmland on the Mexican border, the Wycoff family are murdered by Comanches. However, while carrying the badly wounded lone survivor in his arms, their slave Nate warns of the attack to the empresario Buckley in Victoria. He then enlists Bigfoot and Hays, who are being held prisoner, to help defend the town. Also, Emily tries to get out of a sticky situation when Santa Anna finds her pistol in his bed, thinking she means to kill him. He then gives her an ultimatum: Him or Houston.
4	"Vengeance is Mine"	Roland Joffé	Leslie Greif & Darrell Fetty	June 8, 2015	2.61
On April 21, 1836, Houston puts his plan into action when he and his troops stage a surprise attack on the Mexican Army in the decisive Battle of San Jacinto. It all starts with the Rangers, as a way of distraction, to blow up Vince's Bridge, along with Santa Anna's soldiers who are stationed on it. As both armies engage each other, Emily has had enough with Santa Anna and tries to kill him, but the general flees the scene to join in on the fighting. However, he sees something he's never seen before—defeat. His men are retreating and later surrender, causing him to escape. The Texas Republican Army has won and "el presidente" is captured and imprisoned to be ransomed for a treaty—Santa Anna's release for an independent Texas. Meanwhile, Bigfoot and Hays successfully defend the town of Victoria from Comanches and finally meet up with Deaf Smith to officially ride with the Rangers to rescue Emily who's being held prisoner by Colonel Portilla at his hideout.
5	"The Rise of the Republic"	Roland Joffé	Leslie Greif & Darrell Fetty	June 15, 2015	2.36
Two months after the Battle of San Jacinto, Houston holes up in a brothel in New Orleans. But when he is greeted by Thomas Rusk and Doc Ewing, he is encouraged by them to take a pivotal role in the future of the now newly independent territory of Texas. Meanwhile, the Rangers arrive back in Victoria to celebrate their victory over Mexico, but it is short lived when they decide to rescue Emily from Colonel Portilla's hideout. They take Bigfoot and Hays, who are hastily sworn into the Texas Ranging Company. Also, they must fight the Comanches, who plan to attack Texan immigrants at the border. Houston keeps his promise to Santa Anna, who is being held prisoner at a plantation, to meet President Jackson to discuss a peace treaty at the White House in Washington. Later, Juan Seguín, along with his Tejano troops gather at The Alamo to pay their respects to those who died there and to bury a box of ashes of the slain in tribute.

== Reception ==
=== Ratings ===
Viewership and ratings per episode of Texas Rising
No.	Title	Air date	Rating/share (18–49)	Viewers (millions)	DVR (18–49)	DVR viewers (millions)	Total (18–49)	Total viewers (millions)
1	"From the Ashes"	May 25, 2015	0.6	4.08	TBD	TBD	TBD	TBD
2	"Fate and Fury"	May 26, 2015	0.5	3.39	TBD	TBD	TBD	TBD
3	"Blood for Blood"	June 1, 2015	0.4	3.04	TBD	TBD	TBD	TBD
4	"Vengeance is Mine"	June 8, 2015	0.3	2.61	TBD	TBD	TBD	TBD
5	"Rise of the Republic"	June 15, 2015	0.3	2.36	TBD	TBD	TBD	TBD

=== Critical response ===
The media coverage about the series was somewhat negative, with some debate over whether or not the right blend between historical accuracy and poetic license had been reached - with some sources saying that a channel calling itself "History" invited greater scrutiny on the question. Review aggregator Rotten Tomatoes gives the miniseries a rating of 13% based on 15 reviews, with an average rating of 5.1/10. The site's consensus states, "Tedious and forgettable, Texas Rising is full of offensive stereotypes and a messy multitude of unfocused characters and narratives." Metacritic gives the miniseries a score of 52 out of 100, based on 12 reviews, indicating "mixed reviews".

Days before the show aired, the Associated Press' Lynn Elber wrote that, inspired by the success of the series "Hatfields & McCoys" and "The Bible", History channel lined up several impressive elements for the Texas Rising series. Including shooting it in wide-screen CinemaScope and hiring Oscar-nominated Roland Joffe, "armies of extras [for use] in sprawling battle scenes, and getting Kris Kristofferson, George Strait and Jose Feliciano to add their own music along with the full symphonic score. Elber reported that executive producer Leslie Greif stated that "We wanted to try to tell the story from a lot of perspectives, so there are really no villains in our piece. There are villainous deeds. ... but we didn't want to have a paintbrush and say this side is right and this side is wrong." Greif also said that "The film was vetted by experts but does take liberties for dramatic purposes". He explained "Historically, the battles that occurred were true. We didn't kill anyone who didn't die and didn't keep anyone alive who died (among the real-life figures). The rest we used as a jumping-off spot to tell a great story." With this approach to the historical material Greif's concern was that too many people would miss all the work "spent perfecting each visual and sound element" because they would watch it on a laptop or smartphone, and he felt it best viewed in a darkened room on as big a screen as possible.

In a review Variety columnist Brian Lowry held that the show was "wonderfully cast and otherwise completely wooden". He maintained that it "juggles too many indifferently written, tough-talkin' characters, as if "Lonesome Dove" had experienced a sharp blow to the head." Lowry held that the series did not live up to the level of History channel's previous series "Hatfields & McCoys". Lowry did hold that the concept of trying to fill in the gap for audiences of what happened after the Alamo was a good one, but that the series was unable to do so effectively. He held a major flaw was "the wholly one-dimensional way the Mexican are depicted and that the portrayal of Santa Anna invoked memories of the cartoon Snidely Whiplash and the character The Most Interesting Man in the World from the Dos Equis advertising campaign. Lowry held that the show "pays more attention to the marketing campaign than the script".

The Washington Post reported that the series seemed more concerned with portraying those fighting for Texas's independence as if they were in John Wayne's 1960 film "The Alamo" rather than addressing the complexity of the actual historical events. An approach one might not suspect from a channel that is named "History". The Post held that it was "a love letter to the Lone Star State that some critics say broadcasts conservative politics and punctures History's educational veneer." The Post noted that "History" channel did offer other perspectives "including those of Mexicans, Native Americans and slaves" on the website created for the show but "some of these views didn't seem to make it into Texas Rising." The Post pointed out that Houston had been a former spokesman for Cherokee Indians and was the only Southern governor to resist secession and felt the series not exploring this aspect of his story was "a missed opportunity".

Others also criticized the series appearing on History for being "lousy history", including Alamo Historian at Texas State University Jesus de la Teja, who told reporters for WOAI news radio the series was "playing fast and loose with the facts" and that "It over simplifies and it misrepresents ... trivializing and commercializing history." De la Teja pointed out that it plays up sex and has explosions "which could not have possibly happened with the military technology that was in place in the 1830s." De la Teja pointed out that the series makes use of the semi-legendary character Emily D. West about whom almost nothing is known. He regretted that because of the series on "History" people might confuse Hollywood for history.

The New York Daily News held that the show rekindled the excitement of the "Hatfields and McCoys", once you can identify all the players in the drama. They held that Jeffrey Dean Morgan, Olivier Martinez, and Cynthia Addai-Robinson gave standout performances. They recognized that some inaccuracies were included but even though "There's doubtless some dramatic license here. No matter. It's a classic campfire story, from a land that truly was the Wild West."

Brian Moylan of The Guardian was very critical of the series, complaining that the pacing was off with few battle scenes and too many shots of "dudes hanging around in grubby-looking clothing in front of tents talking about how awful Mexicans and Comanches are ... [and] a lot of dithering and boring discussion of military tactics". Despite this he did hold that it would appeal to the fans of History channel's "Hatfields and McCoys and "The Bible" because it displayed "libertarian and conservative sensibilities". He considered the other series superior to Texas Rising criticising this series for "atrocious dialogue, poor characterization and mechanical acting" by comparison. Moylan held that the writing was bad as it failed to develop characters: "none of the characters exude any sort of individuality at all. In fact, by the end of the first two hours, you will hardly know anyone's name, their place in the hierarchy, or their contributions to the cause." And scenes attempting to establish character "are so heavy-handed that they will render more eye-rolls than engagement." Moylan also felt that the series suffered by lacking any "post-colonial reflection ... in the great scope of history. The line between good guys and bad guys is drawn as simply and thoughtlessly as it is in a backyard game of Cowboys and Indians." He held that his final verdict of the show was that it was "just dreadfully boring." On the positive side, Moylan viewed Adam Hicks' and Dillon Lane's performances as outstanding and also held that the "costumes, sets, and period details seem authentic and well rendered ... you don't doubt the period setting for a second."

The Inquisitr praised the series holding that due to the many dramatic representations of the fight itself the "focus on the aftermath of the 'Battle of the Alamo' was a brave one, and probably the best decision. Persons who were important to the Texas Revolution outside of that event will get their chance to shine." They also held that "the historical inaccuracies" were "a problem that's rather unavoidable". The Inquisitr held that complaints about the series' location backgrounds were unreasonable. Pointing out that Texas as a whole and San Antonio in particular does not look today like it did in the 1800s. The "landscape forever altered" - the city has "cars, paved roads ... [and] a population of nearly 27 million people". The Inquisitr admitted that the series had inaccuracies "such as [what] Texans believed about slavery prior to the Civil War and whether or not Sam Houston would have had a one night stand with the Yellow Rose of Texas." But held that the series should be viewed as within the genre of Historical fiction. They maintained that it was unlikely "made with the intent of being 100 percent true to the times or the characters". They concluded that "it would be impossible for a well-produced and entertaining series to leave a unique mark on viewers by interpreting events exactly as history experts would want. Sometimes you have to shut up and suspend disbelief to enjoy something. Texas Rising is meant to be entertaining and educational ... but mostly entertaining."

The New York Times criticized the pacing of the series saying "a story that seems as if it should be characterized by adventure and derring-do instead is often as flat and drab as a Western plain." They expressed surprise that director Roland Joffé was only able to create "a disjointed collection of clichés, often staged with the clumsiness of bad community theater." The Times held that the writing reduced Houston to a character which "has no magnetism" and made Santa Anna into "something of a repellent caricature". The Times held that by having no depth in the opposition that the Texan heroes were facing, the series seemed trite "The good guys — the Texans — are good, and the bad guys are reductive figures who exist to be hated. ... Native American warriors gallop and whoop; Mexican soldiers and generals enjoy cockfights, executions and all things vile." They also complained that the dialogue was "truly awful" with characters speaking "in sound bites rather than convincing conversation". The Times held that some good performances could be found if one overlooks the drawbacks, singling out Liotta, Fraser, and Jeremy Davies' work in the series. The Times also praised the music video done for the series by Kris Kristofferson, (who appears as Andrew Jackson in the series), doing a cover of Tom Petty's "I Won't Back Down."

== Awards and nominations ==
Won

New York Festivals

- Gold World Medal - Night 3 and 4

Golden Reel Awards

- Best Sound Editing - Long Form Sound Effects and Foley in Television

Nominations

Emmy Awards:

- Outstanding Sound Mixing For A Limited Series Or A Movie - "Night 4"
- Outstanding Sound Editing For A Limited Series, Movie Or A Special - "Night 4"
- Outstanding Original Main Title Theme Music

Online Film & Television Association Awards

- Best Costume Design in a Non-Series
- Best Visual Effects in a Non-Series

Screen Actors Guild Awards

- Best Male Actor in a TV movie/miniseries - Ray Liotta

Women's Image Network Awards:

- Best Actress in a Drama Series - Cynthia Addai-Robinson

Golden Reel Awards

- Best Sound Editing - Long Form Dialogue and ADR in Television

International Film Music Critics Association

- Best Original Score for a Television Series
