= In the Company of Heroes =

2003 book by Michael Durant

In the Company of Heroes: A True Story
- Hardcover edition
- Author: Mike Durant, Steven Hartov, Mark Bowden (Introduction)
- Language: English
- Genre: War, Historical Nonfiction
- Publisher: New American Library
- Publication date: 2003 (Hardcover) 2006 (Paperback)
- Publication place: United States
- Media type: Hardcover and Trade Paperback
- Pages: 361 (Hardcover) 387 (Paperback)
- ISBN: 978-0-451-21993-0
- OCLC: 77521882

In the Company of Heroes is a book by Michael Durant and Steven Hartov about Durant's experiences in the Battle of Mogadishu, Korea, the Persian Gulf, Thailand, Panama, and Iraq. In the Battle of Mogadishu, the MH-60 Black Hawk helicopter code-named Super Six-Four that Durant was piloting was shot down over Somalia by a rocket-propelled grenade on October 3, 1993, and he was attacked by a mob and had to fight for his life. MSG Gary Gordon and SFC Randy Shughart volunteered to try to protect the pilot from the mob; while Durant was severely injured, he survived, but Gordon and Shughart did not, and were posthumously awarded the Medal of Honor for their bravery. Durant became a prisoner of Somali warlord Mohamed Farah Aidid for 11 days.

The introduction is written by Mark Bowden, author of the book Black Hawk Down: A Story of Modern War. Durant was portrayed by Ron Eldard in the film Black Hawk Down, based on Bowden's book.

The book was a New York Times bestseller.

Publishers Weekly reviewed it as a good look into war, and engaging, though lacking in introspection and sometimes off-topic.
