= Something Is Out There =

1988 American science fiction television miniseries

- Created by: Frank Lupo
- Written by: Frank Lupo
- Directed by: Richard A. Colla
- Starring: Joseph Cortese; Maryam d'Abo; Gregory Sierra; George Dzundza; Kim Delaney; John Putch; Robert Webber
- Composer: Sylvester Levay
- Countries of origin: United States; Australia
- Original language: English
- No. of episodes: 9

Production
- Executive producers: Frank Lupo; John Ashley
- Production locations: Los Angeles, California; Sydney, Australia
- Cinematography: Laszlo George (USA); Geoff Burton (Australia); Arthur R. Botham
- Editors: David Ramirez; Howard Deane; Larry L. Mills
- Camera setup: Kenneth C. Barrows
- Running time: 180 minutes (miniseries); 45 minutes (weekly series)
- Production companies: Columbia Pictures Television (USA); Invader Productions, Inc. (USA); Hoyts Productions (Australia)

Original release
- Network: NBC
- Release: May 8 – December 9, 1988

Something Is Out There is a 1988 American science fiction television miniseries that aired on NBC, and a weekly series that followed in the fall of 1988, which lasted from October to December 1988.

== Plot summary ==
Jack Breslin (Joseph Cortese) is a police officer investigating brutal murders in which organs have been removed from the victims with (by human standards) surgically impossible speed. He learns that the crimes are being committed by a monstrous alien insectoid prisoner known as a xenomorph, possessing shape-shifting and physical possession abilities, who has escaped from an alien prison starship passing by the Solar System, and he teams up with a beautiful medical officer from that ship, Ta'Ra (Maryam d'Abo), to track down the villain. Ta'Ra has assorted superhuman abilities, including telepathy and superhuman agility, which come in handy during the mission.

== Cast ==
- Joe Cortese as Jack Breslin
- Maryam d'Abo as Ta'Ra
- George Dzundza as Frank Dileo
- Gregory Sierra as Victor Maldonado
- Kim Delaney as Mandy Estabrook
- John Putch as Wendle
- Robert Webber as Commissioner Estabrook
- Earl Billings as Coroner
- Michael DeLuise as Punk

== Notes ==
Originally a miniseries, it drew high ratings for NBC and critics noted the chemistry between Jack and Ta'Ra as one of its high points. One week after its ratings success, Brandon Tartikoff announced it would become a weekly series. 13 episodes were ordered. Something Is Out There fared poorly opposite the very successful Dallas and the show was later moved to compete with Beauty and the Beast where ratings only worsened. The series was canceled after only six one-hour episodes were broadcast, with two additional episodes produced but not broadcast at the time except in isolated cases in the US.

Due to its short run, the series is not often found in syndication, but the Sci-Fi Channel did include it as part of a rotation of short-lived series, including broadcasting the previously unaired episodes. An edited down version of the miniseries has aired as a syndicated television movie.

The one-hour episodes also appear occasionally at Crackle's website and on the app.

== Development ==
Originally conceived by Frank Lupo in 1987 with the title Invader, NBC ordered a four-hour mini-series for broadcast on May 8, 1988 with a budget of $7.5 million. Shooting took 41 days on locations in Los Angeles and Australia.

Producers John Ashley and Frank Lupo decided to alter the program's concept to cope with the comparatively smaller budget of the weekly series. "Things definitely change fast when a mini-series or movie becomes a weekly series," said Ashley. "It's great when you've got four hours, $7.5 million and the talents of Rick Baker and John Dykstra to play around with. But what happens when you're suddenly cut to a million per episode budget, don't have the talents of Baker or Dykstra and have to take the mini-series concept to the next level while turning out an hour a week? What happens is that you make changes."

It was decided to focus the show on the relationship between Jack and Ta'Ra, on Ta'Ra's special abilities and to reject a "monster of the week" approach. Ta'Ra, who was later revealed to be from a distant planet called Zeton, chooses to stay on Earth posing as Jack's cousin. The show strayed from its science-fiction origins with supernatural stories featuring telekinesis and telepathy.

"In the early episodes, we felt we had pulled our reins in too far. We discovered that many people were expecting an alien every week, because of the mini-series, and were being disappointed," said Ashley in an interview with Starlog during filming of the eighth episode. "What we were giving them just wasn't working. So, we took a step back and looked at what elements made the mini-series work and made the later episodes along the lines of where the show should have gone. We went back to basics. We brought the creature from the mini-series back for a two-part episode, gave Ta'Ra some additional powers and made the show more science fictional in nature."

The changes were not enough to draw audience members back however, and Something Is Out There was eventually cancelled.

== Episodes ==
- Something Is Out There: (Two-part miniseries) Air Date:5/8 and 5/9/88.

=== Series ===
No.	Title	Directed by	Written by	Original release date
1	"Gladiator"	Richard A. Colla	Frank Lupo	October 21, 1988
An escaped criminal goes gunning for Jack, using armor and a gun stolen from Ta'Ra.
2	"Don't Look Back"	Richard A. Colla	Burt Pearl	October 28, 1988
Jack and Ta'Ra try to help a child on the run from government agents and something darker.
3	"In His Own Image"	Larry Shaw	Burt Pearl	November 4, 1988
A woman finds her missing brother's head as an exhibit in a wax museum.
4	"Night of the Visitors"	James Darren	Christian Darren	November 25, 1988
Ta'Ra thinks she may have a way back home when she recognizes an author's description of his encounter with aliens.
5	"A Message from Mr. Cool"	Don Medford	Paul Bernbaum	December 2, 1988
A psychotic thinks he's getting messages from a ventriloquist's dummy.
6	"Good Psychics Are Hard to Come By"	Lyndon Chubbuck	Paul Bernbaum	December 9, 1988
Jack is assigned to work with a psychic on a kidnapping case, but is the man truly psychic or does his information come from a more criminal source?
7	"A Hearse of Another Color"	Richard Colla	Paul Bernbaum	UNAIRED
Jack's cousin begs the officer to help him track down a corpse missing from the mortuary he works at.
8	"The Keeper"	Jorge Montesi	Paul Bernbaum	UNAIRED
A seaside town becomes paralyzed by terror after one of its residents finds wreckage from Ta'Ra's spacecraft, creating a threat which could doom the Earth.
