= Robert Munic =

American filmmaker

- Born: Chicago, Illinois, U.S.
- Occupations: Producer, writer, director
- Notable work: Empire, Ice
- Spouse: Ingrid Rogers (m. 2005)
- Children: 2

Robert Munic is an American producer, writer, director and occasional actor. He is a director and the writer/co-executive producer of the television series Empire.

== Selected production credits ==
Year	Title	Position
1993	The Pros & Cons of Breathing	Screenplay, Director
1996	Timelock	Director
1997-99	NightMan	Director
1999	In a Class of His Own	Writer
2008	The Cleaner	Executive producer, Episodic Writer
2014	Gang Related	Consulting Producer, Episodic Writer
2015	Murder in the First	Co-Executive Producer, Episodic Writer
2015	Empire	Co-Executive Producer, occasional Director, Episodic Writer
2016-17	Ice	Executive producer, Writer
2017	Rogue	Consulting Producer, Episodic Writer
2019	Tales	Executive producer, Episodic Writer

== Selected acting credits ==
Year	Title	Role	Notes
1989	Jake and the Fatman	Morgan Beaudine	Episode: “Side by Side”
1990	Archie: To Riverdale and Back Again	Chip	TV movie
1990	21 Jump Street	Marty	Episode: “Blackout”
1992	Radio Flyer	Older Fisher	Film
1993	Bloodlines: Murder in the Family	Chuck	TV movie
1998	Buffy the Vampire Slayer	Intern	Episode: “Killed by Death“
