= Geoffrey Blake (actor) =

American actor (born 1962)

- Born: Geoffrey Lewis Blake; August 20, 1962 (age 64); Baltimore, Maryland, U.S.
- Occupation: Actor
- Years active: 1983–present

Geoffrey Lewis Blake (born August 20, 1962) is an American actor. He is best known for his role as Wesley (the abusive radical boyfriend) opposite Robin Wright's Jenny in Forrest Gump (1994). Blake has appeared alongside Tom Hanks in multiple films. He is also known for the role of the preppy pipe-smoking astrophysicist Fisher in the 1997 film Contact opposite Jodie Foster.

== Early life ==
Blake was born on August 20, 1962, in Baltimore, Maryland, the son of Marjorie Myers (née Lewis) and Avery Felton Blake. Blake's film credits include Contact, Young Guns, Forrest Gump and Cast Away. He also voiced a character in FernGully: The Last Rainforest.

Blake graduated from San Ramon Valley High School, Danville, California. He starred in Oklahoma! in high school.

He had recurring roles in the television series It's Garry Shandling's Show, Renegade, Paper Dolls, Homefront and Any Day Now. His notable television guest-starring roles include playing Arjin in the Star Trek: Deep Space Nine episode "Playing God", Strife in the Charmed episode "Apocalypse Not", and Dominic in the House episode "Lines in the Sand". In 2012, Blake appeared in the Criminal Minds episode "Closing Time", as an unsub who castrated his victims.

Blake is a graduate of the University of Southern California school of theare and a member of the Sigma Nu.

In 2010, he guest starred in the In Plain Sight episode "Whistle Stop", as an informant of the FBI to enter WitSec.

== Filmography ==
=== Film ===
Year	Title	Role	Notes
1984	The Last Starfighter	Gary	
1985	Secret Admirer	Ricardo	
1988	Young Guns	J. McCloskey	
1990	Men at Work	Frost	
1991	Critters 3	Frank	
1992	FernGully: The Last Rainforest	Ralph (voice)	
1993	The Pickle	Clem	
1993	Philadelphia Experiment II	Logan	
1994	Forrest Gump	Wesley	
1995	Dominion	Joel	
1995	Apollo 13	GUIDO Gold	
1996	The War at Home	David	
1996	Entertaining Angels: The Dorothy Day Story	Floyd Dell	
1997	Contact	Fisher	
1997	Wag the Dog	Media Guy #1	Credited as Geffrey Blake
1998	Getting Personal	Kilmer Buckingham IV	
1998	Heaven or Vegas	Billy	
1998	Mighty Joe Young	Vern	
1999	EDtv	Keith	
2000	Cast Away	Maynard Graham	
2008	Frost/Nixon	Interview Director	
2014	Kiss Me	George	
2019	Midway	John Ford	
2022	Section Eight	Senator Jim Graham	

=== Television ===
Year	Title	Role	Notes
1983	ABC Afterschool Specials	Ron	Episode: "But It's Not My Fault"
1983–1986	Cagney & Lacey	Redding / Jeremy Martin	2 episodes
1984	Paper Dolls	Steve	5 episodes
1984–1989	CBS Schoolbreak Special	Dexter Lee Smith / Lon	2 episodes
1985	North Beach and Rawhide	Tepper	TV movie
1986	One Terrific Guy	Mark Johnson	TV movie
1986	It's Garry Shandling's Show.	Lewis	6 episodes
1987	My Sister Sam	Elliot Glickman	Episode: "Anything for a Friend"
1987	The Abduction of Kari Swenson	Paul Swenson	TV movie
1987	21 Jump Street	Jeffrey Stone	Episode: "Don't Pet the Teacher"
1987	ALF	Lizard	Episode: "Some Enchanted Evening"
1988	Dead or Alive	Miller	TV movie
1989	Heartbeat	Vince Kazak	Episode: "South and a Little to the Right of Eden"
1989	Nightbreaker	Python	TV movie
1989	Life Goes On	Larry Hanson	Episode: "Paige's Date"
1990	Hunter	Benny Gore	Episode: "Son and Heir"
1990	Alien Nation	Michael Ducouski / Andron's Father	2 episodes; uncredited in one episode
1991	Matlock	Sam Spelvin	Episode: "The Critic"
1991	Fatal Exposure	Scott	TV movie
1992	Maid for Each Other	Jerry the Locksmith	TV movie
1992	Civil Wars	Lawrence Randall	Episode: "Whippet 'Til It Breaks"
1992	Homefront	Jay Tweed	3 episodes
1992	The Keys	Randy	TV movie
1992	L.A. Law	Ray Meacham	Episode: "Say Goodnight Gracie"
1992	The Hat Squad	Jake	Episode: "92 Seconds to Midnight"
1993	Marilyn & Bobby: Her Final Affair	Carl	TV movie
1993	The Adventures of Brisco County, Jr.	Beck	Episode: "Steel Horses"
1993–1996	Renegade	Hound Adams	5 episodes
1994	Star Trek: Deep Space Nine	Arjin	Episode: "Playing God"
1994	One Woman's Courage	Ted McKenna	TV movie
1995	Shame II: The Secret	Gilbert Rawlins	TV movie
1995	Fast Company	Sgt. Harriman	TV movie
1995	Strange Luck		Episode: "Last Chance"
1996	Dr. Quinn, Medicine Woman	Johnny Reed	Episode: "Eye for an Eye"
1996	Murder One	Eric Gilchrist	Episode: "Chapter Eight, Year Two"
1996	Marshal Law	Realtor #1	TV movie
1996	Jules	Mike	TV movie
1997	Temporarily Yours	Dennis	Episode: "Independence Day"
1997	Fired Up	Jack Goodman	Episode: "You Don't Know Jack"
1997	NYPD Blue	Dr. Richard Jones	Episode: "Lost Israel: Part 2"
1997	The Guardian	Edgerton	TV movie
1998	Brink!	Jimmy	Disney Channel Original Movie
1998	Brimstone	Toby Cole	Episode: "Repentance"
1998	Max Q	Jonah Randall	TV movie
1999–2002	Any Day Now	Glenn	7 episodes
2000	Rated X	Michael Kennedy	TV movie
2000	The Pretender	Dr. Jason Earl	Episode: "Junk"
2000	Charmed	Strife	Episode: "Apocalypse, Not"
2001	Touched by an Angel	Jimmy Rendon	Episode: "Angels Anonymous"
2001, 2009	CSI: Crime Scene Investigation	Mark Jones / Matt Orton / Special Agent Conners	2 episodes
2002	Life Without Dick	Detective Murphy	Direct-to-video
2002	First Monday	Phil Shakely	Episode: "Strip Search"
2002	The Agency		Episode: "Finale"
2002	The Master of My Life	Mr. Cook	TV movie
2006	House	Dominic Kelvey	Episode: "Lines in the Sand"
2007	Raines	Carlton Hayworth	Episode: "Closure"
2007	Private Practice	Jack Grossman	Episode: "In Which Dell Finds His Fight"
2008	Saving Grace		Episode: "You Are My Partner"
2008	Monk	Ike	Episode: "Mr. Monk and the Miracle"
2010	Grey's Anatomy	Jim	Episode: "Push"
2010	In Plain Sight	Earl Donaldson	Episode: "Whistle Stop"
2010	The Event	Peter	2 episodes
2010	CSI: Miami	Brad Webb	Episode: "On the Hook"
2010	Leverage	Bixby	Episode: "The Big Bang Job"
2011	Memphis Beat	Chet Mayland	Episode: "Body of Evidence"
2011	Ricochet	Dr. Brooks	TV movie
2011–2013	Franklin & Bash	Gerry Nelson	4 episodes
2012	Criminal Minds	Michael	Episode: "Closing Time"
2013	Vegas	Frank	Episode: "Little Fish"
2013	Perception	Preston Resnick	Episode: "Alienation"
2013	NCIS	Marc Attencio	Episode: "Gut Check"
2013	Mob City	Assistant D.A. Lloyd Reese	2 episodes
2014	Beauty and the Beast	Brian Hendricks	Episode: "Don't Die on Me"
2014	Murder in the First	Howey	Episode: "Pilot"
2015	Texas Rising	Colonel George 'Boots' Hockley	4 episodes
2015	Agent X	Gray Cromwell	3 episodes
2015	The Man in the High Castle	Doc Meyer	4 episodes
2016	Bull	Oscar Weber	Episode: "The Woman in 8D"
2016	Pure Genius	Dr. Madison	Episode: "Pilot"
2016	The Infamous	Sergeant Danziger	TV movie
2017	Grimm	Dr. Victor Shelley	Episode: "The Son Also Rises"
2018	DC's Legends of Tomorrow	Uncle Lucious	Episode: "Amazing Grace"
2019	Charmed	The Sentinel	Episode: "Careful What You Witch For"
2019	Godfather of Harlem	Kenny O'Donnell	2 episodes
2020	All Rise	Gruff Man Daniel Morris	Episode: "Bye Bye Bernie"
2022	Bridge and Tunnel	Designer	2 episodes
2024	Hotel Cocaine	Peter Cunningham	2 episodes

=== Video games ===
Year	Title	Role	Notes
2002	Law & Order: Dead on the Money	James Stanton	
2012	Dishonored	City Watch	
2016	The Technomancer	Patience / Additional voices	
