= Ice (American TV series) =

- Created by: Robert Munic
- Starring: Jeremy Sisto; Cam Gigandet; Raymond J. Barry; Ray Winstone; Judi Shekoni; Jocelyn Hudon; Audrey Marie Anderson; Donald Sutherland; Ella Thomas; Rey Gallegos
- Composers: Simon Franglen; Guillaume Roussel
- Country of origin: United States
- Original language: English
- No. of seasons: 2
- No. of episodes: 20

Production
- Executive producers: Robert Munic; Antoine Fuqua; Ron Bass; Vince Geraldis; Hans Tobeason
- Producers: Craig Forrest; Joe Haplan; David Alex Boorstein
- Production companies: Fuqua Films (season 1); Benero Productions (season 2); Alcon Entertainment; Entertainment One

Original release
- Network: Audience Network
- Release: November 16, 2016 – May 30, 2018

Ice is an American television series created by Robert Munic. The project, which began airing in late 2016 on Audience Network was ordered straight-to-series with an order of 10 episodes on August 2, 2016. The project was originally ordered in 2014 but was dropped for creative reasons. The series was then released on November 16, 2016. On June 16, 2017, the series was renewed for a second season.

On July 30, 2018, the series' cancellation was confirmed via a comment from the show's official Facebook page.

== Plot ==
=== Season One ===
The series follows the lives of a Los Angeles diamond trader's family business called Green & Green Diamond after recent events in which one of the patriarch's sons has killed a prominent diamond dealer, while his step-brother has to bail him out and save the family business. The Green family, however, is trapped between doing a clean and dirty business. Lady Rah, a diamond dealer and philanthropist from Sierra Leone has a huge interest in working with Green & Green. She forcefully integrates herself into Green & Green by blackmailing Jake Green that she needs an account of $25 million or he risks losing his daughter. As the season proceeds, the ailing cooperation between Isaac Green (Jake's father and the owner of Green & Green Diamond) weakens progressively and begins losing the appropriate mental judgement. Lady Rah continues blackmailing Jake into cooperating with her. This forces Jake and his step-brother, Freddy Green, to transport illegal diamonds over the border for a buyer who was willing to settle at an amount of $20 million. They lose the diamonds to one of Lady Rah's trusted operatives, however Isaac succumbs to the pressure and in the process enters into a huge conflict with longtime associate and former brother-in-law, Cam Rose.

The two men struggle and Isaac collapses hitting his head really hard. He later dies in hospital after fading while on life support. After the will is read, it turns out that the Isaac split the shares of Green & Green equally to four people: his granddaughter, Willow (daughter to Jake and his ex-wife Ava Green); his two sons; and his ailing sister, who happens to be Cam Rose's ex-wife. The will distribution greatly affects Cam expectations, and as a result he embarks on a mission to capture the easiest 25% from his ex-wife. However, the 25% assigned to his granddaughter are assigned to Ava, her mother with custody. Jake continues trying to repay Lady Rah, however, in the meantime, Lady Rah's boss Peter appears.

Apparently, Peter is blackmailing Lady Rah by kidnapping her daughter. Lady Rah is in the process of using all her savings to save her daughter's life and return to Sierra Leone. Peter becomes relentless with Cam promises that he will use his supposed 25% to capture the Green & Green business. As such, he kidnaps Ava Green to get an opportunity to blackmail Jake into giving him the company by force. The FBI advances their case based on the taped information from Cam's office. Jake eventually settles for more dynamic terms of doing business while freeing his ex-wife from Pieter. In the season finale, Freddy bumps into Pieter's new office at the Greens and finds Jake negotiating further terms of their contract. Lady Rah storms in with her security men and shoots Peter's guards. At the end, Jake is standing in the middle of Pieter and Lady Rah's guns, waiting for a shooting opportunity.

== Cast ==
=== Main ===
- Jeremy Sisto as Freddy Green
- Cam Gigandet as Jake Green
- Raymond J. Barry as Isaac Green (season 1)
- Ray Winstone as Cam Rose
- Chloe East (season 1)/Jocelyn Hudon (season 2) as Willow Green
- Audrey Marie Anderson as Ava Green
- Donald Sutherland as Pieter Van De Bruin (season 1)
- Ella Thomas as Lala Agabaria (season 1)
- Rey Gallegos as Carlos Vega
- Catherine Barroll as Sarah Rose
- Judi Shekoni as Lady Rah

=== Recurring ===
- Ashley Thomas as Malcolm Rose (season 2)
- Laura Vandervoort as Tessa Pryor (season 2)
- Amy Madigan as Diane Pierce (season 2)
- D.B. Sweeney as Jeff Reardon (season 2)

== Episodes ==
Season	Episodes	Originally released	
Season	Episodes	First released	Last released
1	10	November 16, 2016	February 8, 2017
2	10	March 28, 2018	May 30, 2018

=== Season 1 (2016–17) ===
No. overall	No. in season	Title	Directed by	Written by	Original air date
1	1	"Hyenas"	Antoine Fuqua	Robert Munic	November 16, 2016
2	2	"Run You Bastards Run"	Ashley Way	Robert Munic	November 23, 2016
3	3	"The Line"	Norberto Barba	Holly Harold	November 30, 2016
4	4	"Two Handkerchiefs"	Ashley Way	Benjamin Daniel Lobato	December 7, 2016
5	5	"Tears of the Gods"	Thomas Carter	Story by : Robert Munic; Teleplay by : Robert Munic, Marc Blitstein and Brian Rousso	December 14, 2016
6	6	"Facet"	John David Coles	Story by : Michael Cobian; Teleplay by : Mark Valadez	January 11, 2017
7	7	"Clarity"	T.J. Scott	Joe Halpin	January 18, 2017
8	8	"Side Trip"	Peter Werner	Holly Harold	January 25, 2017
9	9	"The Cut"	Jon Amiel	Joe Halpin and Holly Harold	February 1, 2017
10	10	"Stand Off"	Rod Holcomb	Joe Halpin and Holly Harold	February 8, 2017

=== Season 2 (2018) ===
No. overall	No. in season	Title	Directed by	Written by	Original air date
11	1	"Game of Stones"	Edward Allen Bernero	Edward Allen Bernero	March 28, 2018
12	2	"Thicker Than Water"	Edward Allen Bernero	Kim Clements	April 4, 2018
13	3	"Heart of Darkness"	Guy Norman Bee	Holly Harold	April 11, 2018
14	4	"Blood Brothers"	Guy Norman Bee	Robert David Port	April 18, 2018
15	5	"Rendezvous with Death"	Samira Radsi	Devon Greggory	April 25, 2018
16	6	"Strange Friends"	Guy Norman Bee	Fredrick Kotto	May 2, 2018
17	7	"Two Ounces"	Guy Norman Bee	Nicky Hawthorne	May 9, 2018
18	8	"Dig Two Graves...At Least"	Ashley Way	Jackson Sinder	May 16, 2018
19	9	"Clouds"	Edward Allen Bernero	Jason J. Bernero	May 23, 2018
20	10	"It All Comes to This"	Edward Allen Bernero	Edward Allen Bernero	May 30, 2018

== Broadcast ==
Ice aired on Audience Network from November 16, 2016, to May 30, 2018. The series was also shown in several countries.

== Home video ==
The first season of Ice was released on DVD by Entertainment One in July 2017.
