= Heaven or Vegas =

- Directed by: Gregory C. Haynes
- Written by: Gregory C. Haynes
- Produced by: Gregory C. Haynes; Shane Walker
- Starring: Richard Grieco; Yasmine Bleeth; Andy Romano; Monica Potter; Sarah Schaub; Geoffrey Blake
- Cinematography: S. Douglas Smith
- Music by: Stephen Edwards
- Distributed by: Cineville
- Release date: 1996
- Running time: 106 min.
- Country: United States
- Language: English

Heaven or Vegas is a 1996 movie which was a romantic drama that starred Yasmine Bleeth and Richard Grieco.

== Plot ==
Rachel (Yasmine Bleeth) is a woman looking for a way out of her dead-end existence. Six years after she ran away from her home in Utah, Rachel is living in Las Vegas, where she works as an exotic dancer and an occasional call girl.

Rachel lives in a fantasy world as a way of distancing herself from her bleak surroundings, and she imagines that a Prince Charming will one day rescue her from her fallen world. On the inside she is still a dreamy little girl who believes in fairy tales. She thinks that her prince may have finally arrived when she meets Navy (Richard Grieco), a high-class stud-for-sale who has tired of his humiliating life in the sex industry.

Navy is fond of Rachel, and when he decides to leave male prostitution behind and move to Montana to start a new life, she eagerly joins him. However, along the way she persuades him to make a stop in Utah so that she can check in with her family. Rachel and Navy discover that it's difficult to hide their respective pasts from Rachel's straightlaced family and that they're out of step with life in small town America.

Navy also finds himself attracted to Rachel's gorgeous and "virginal" stepsister, Lilli (Monica Potter), which leads a heartbroken Rachel to run away just as Navy realizes that Rachel is the one for him. Rachels sister Paige runs away looking for her and is taken hostage along with Rachel by drifters. Navy and Billy dramatically rescue them from the psychotic drifters. Later Rachel and Navy move to Montana to start their life together and they have two Sons.

== Cast ==
- Yasmine Bleeth as Rachel
- Richard Grieco as Navy
- Monica Potter as Lilli
- Andy Romano as Mr. Hodges
- Suzanne Barnes as Joanne
- Sarah Schaub as Paige
- Geoffrey Blake as Billy
- James Ecklund as Cole
- Stephen Lisk as Benny
- Matt Bohling as Trevor
- Raif Battist as Petee
- Marklen Kennedy as Donald
- Scott Sundell as Jimmy
- Gregory C. Haynes as Jason
- Kristina Krofft as Monet
- Anne Sward as Miss Jane
- Heather Mason as Samantha
- Stephen Brathe as Vagrant
- Saren Nofs-Snyder as Rich lady
- Jeff Haugen as Dancing DJ
- Christian Martin as G
- The Ballet School as Dancers
- Steve Bethers as Thug (uncredited)
- Bryce Sorensen as stunning boy in swing set scene
- Jared Robertson as Jay (uncredited)

== Production credits ==
- Gregory C. Haynes (Director and Writer)
- Shane Walker (Associate Producer)
- Cineville - Storm Entertainment (Production Company)

== Trivia ==
Yasmine Bleeth and Richard Grieco, who both starred in this movie, also dated each other.
