= The Long Walk Home =

1990 film by Richard Pearce

- Directed by: Richard Pearce
- Written by: John Cork
- Produced by: Howard W. Koch Jr. Dave Bell
- Starring: Sissy Spacek; Whoopi Goldberg; Dwight Schultz; Ving Rhames; Dylan Baker
- Narrated by: Mary Steenburgen
- Cinematography: Roger Deakins
- Edited by: Bill Yahraus
- Music by: George Fenton
- Distributed by: Miramax Films
- Release date: December 21, 1990
- Running time: 97 minutes
- Country: United States
- Language: English
- Budget: $6 million
- Box office: $4.8 million

The Long Walk Home is a 1990 American historical drama film starring Sissy Spacek and Whoopi Goldberg, and directed by Richard Pearce.

Set in Alabama, it is based on a screenplay about the Montgomery bus boycott (1955–1956) by John Cork and a short film by the same name, produced by students at the University of Southern California in 1988.

== Origins ==
The feature film is based on a short screenplay and film of the same name, written by John Cork, then a graduate student in directing at USC. He had submitted his script to the Cinema Department for consideration, hoping also to direct it. While USC selected Cork's script for production, the department assigned Beverlyn E. Fray, another student, to direct it. The scenario on which the film is based, actually happened to Cork and his maid, Elizabeth Gregory Taylor, in his hometown of Montgomery, Alabama. The short film won several awards, including first place at the Black American Cinema Society. Cork, however, was unhappy with the finished project and unsuccessfully tried to block screenings of the short film.

== Plot ==
The film was expanded as a feature.

Set in Montgomery, Alabama, United States, during the 1955 Montgomery bus boycott, it follows Odessa Cotter (Whoopi Goldberg), an African-American woman who works as a maid/nanny for Miriam Thompson (Sissy Spacek). Odessa and her family confront typical issues faced by African Americans in the South at the time: poverty, racism, segregation, and violence. The black community has begun a widespread boycott of the city-owned buses to end segregation; Odessa is forced to take long walks both ways to work.

Miriam Thompson offers to give her a ride two days a week to ensure she gets to work on time and to lessen the fatigue her "long walk home" is causing. Around the city, some informal carpools and other systems are starting, but most of the black residents are forced to walk to work.

As the boycott continues, tensions rise in the city. Black residents have been the majority riders on the city-owned buses, and the system is suffering financially. Miriam's decision to support Odessa by giving her a ride becomes an issue with her husband, Norman Thompson (Dwight Schultz), and other prominent members of the white community who want the boycott to end. Miriam has to choose between what she believes is right or succumb to pressure from her husband and their friends.

After an argument with her husband, Miriam decides to follow her heart. She becomes involved in a carpool group to help other black workers like Odessa. In the film's final scene, Miriam and her daughter Mary Catherine (Lexi Randall), who is the narrator of the story in flashback, join Odessa and the other protesters in standing against oppression.

== Cast ==
- Sissy Spacek as Miriam Thompson
- Whoopi Goldberg as Odessa Cotter
- Dwight Schultz as Norman Thompson
- Ving Rhames as Herbert Cotter
- Dylan Baker as Tunker Thompson
- Erika Alexander as Selma Cotter
- Lexi Randall as Mary Catherine (as Lexi Faith Randall)
- Richard Parnell Habersham as Theodore Cotter
- Jason Weaver as Franklin Cotter
- Crystal Robbins as Sara Thompson
- Cherene Snow as Claudia
- Chelcie Ross as Martin
- Dan Butler as Charlie
- Philip Sterling as Winston
- Michael Sansom as Eugene (Angry Man)
- Schuyler Fisk as Judy (Girl at Oak Park)
- Mary Steenburgen as Narrator

== Development ==
One of the three GM "old-look" transit buses used in this film was the Montgomery Bus Lines bus #2857, which Rosa Parks had been riding when she refused to give up her seat and was arrested. (Her arrest was the catalyst for the black community's calling the boycott.) By the time of the film, the bus was in poor condition. The filmmakers had it given a partial repaint and towed it by a cable for its scenes in the movie. It is now owned by the Henry Ford Museum in Dearborn, Michigan, where it is on permanent display.

Cinematographer John Bailey was to have made his directorial debut on this film but was replaced by Richard Pearce early into production.

== Release ==
The film was released theatrically on December 21, 1990. In the U.S., it gained another theatrical release in March 1991 after Miramax withdrew the film from its limited December 1990 release due to the heavy competition of the 1990 holiday season.

After the film's theatrical run, it was released to videocassette by Live Home Video in the United States and in Canada that same year by Cineplex Odeon.

In 2002, the film was released twice on DVD by Platinum Disc and Artisan Entertainment, both presented in full-screen without bonus features. Both DVDs are now discontinued. On January 29, 2013, a new DVD was released by Lionsgate, under license from Miramax. It is still in full-screen and does not contain any bonus features. A widescreen DVD is available in Spain.

== Reception ==
=== Critical response ===
The Long Walk Home received mostly positive reviews from critics. On the review aggregator website Rotten Tomatoes, 88% of 17 critics' reviews are positive, with an average rating of 6.7/10. Metacritic, which uses a weighted average, assigned the film a score of 73 out of 100, based on 13 critics, indicating "generally favorable" reviews.

Roger Ebert gave the film three and a half out of four stars, praising the performances by Spacek and Goldberg, while criticizing some aspects of the film, like the inclusion of a white "narrator".

== See also ==
- Civil rights movement in popular culture
