= Playing God (Star Trek: Deep Space Nine) =

- Star Trek: Deep Space Nine episode
- Episode no.: Season 2 Episode 17
- Directed by: David Livingston
- Story by: Jim Trombetta
- Teleplay by: Jim Trombetta; Michael Piller
- Production code: 437
- Original air date: February 28, 1994

Guest appearances
- Geoffrey Blake as Arjin; Ron Taylor as Klingon Chef; Richard Poe as Gul Evek; Chris Nelson Norris as Trajok

Episode chronology
← Previous "Shadowplay"	Next → "Profit and Loss"
- Star Trek: Deep Space Nine season 2

"Playing God" is the 37th episode of the science fiction television series Star Trek: Deep Space Nine. It is the 17th episode of the second season. "Playing God" aired on syndicated television starting on February 26, 1994.

Set in the 24th century, the series follows the adventures on Deep Space Nine, a space station located adjacent to a stable wormhole between the Alpha and Gamma quadrants of the Milky Way Galaxy, near the planet Bajor. This episode explores the species known as the Trill, some of whom are symbiotically joined to long-lived creatures known as "symbionts". In this episode, while Trill officer Jadzia Dax mentors a candidate for joining, a proto-universe threatens to destroy the station and Bajor.

== Plot ==
Arjin, a young Trill man, arrives on Deep Space Nine. Jadzia Dax is to evaluate him for suitability to be joined with a symbiont; the prospect makes him ill-at-ease and defensive, since hosts of the Dax symbiont have had a reputation as very harsh mentors, especially Jadzia's predecessor Curzon. When Arjin meets Jadzia he is surprised to find her laid-back and free-spirited.

Arjin's first job is to accompany Dax through the Wormhole in a runabout. An accident occurs and the two Trills bring the runabout back to the station damaged, with a strange mass attached to it. Chief O'Brien removes the mass and contains it securely for further study.

Meanwhile, Dax has been getting to know Arjin. He seems aloof but preoccupied with what other people think of him, and is applying for a symbiont mainly to please his father. He seems to have few interests or goals. Dax is nervous about confronting Arjin about his motivations. Her friend Benjamin Sisko reminds her that during her own training under the notorious Curzon, he was very hard on her, and challenged her confidence in herself.

An infestation of Cardassian voles shorts out various equipment, including the containment-field for the unidentified mass in the lab. Arjin and Dax realize that the matter may actually be a tiny universe. It is expanding quickly and will soon pose a danger to the station. The crew prepares to destroy the universe, but are halted when Dax finds that it holds signs of life.

As Sisko ponders the matter, Dax speaks to Arjin about his performance. She reveals that Curzon's high expectations for her actually helped her become stronger and more ready to become a host. Before she was joined to Dax, Jadzia was shy and sensitive, and Curzon often reduced her to tears. Nonetheless, in the end, she got her symbiont, and she encourages Arjin to strive for more.

Sisko decides the proto-universe must be removed from Deep Space Nine. Dax and Arjin board a runabout to ferry the universe back through the wormhole. She allows Arjin to take the helm, a challenge that he accepts.

As they rush through the wormhole, the expanding proto-universe becomes unstable, making the runabout difficult to fly. Arjin's careful navigation safely brings them out of danger and releases the little universe out into space; thus he proves himself and earns his positive recommendation from Jadzia Dax.

== Character notes ==
In 2018, SyFy included this episode on their Jadzia Dax binge-watching guide.

Armin Shimerman's nose makeup piece for the character Quark was not ready, so a different one was used, giving him a slightly different look than in other episodes.

== Releases ==
On April 1, 2003, Season 2 of Star Trek: Deep Space Nine was released on DVD video discs, with 26 episodes on seven discs.

This episode was released in 2017 on DVD with the complete series box set, which had 176 episodes on 48 discs.
