= Bolt (1995 film) =

1995 film

- Film poster
- Directed by: Henri Colline; George Mendeluk
- Written by: Henri Colline (screenplay); Rod Hewitt, Fabienne Rigaud (story)
- Produced by: Rod Hewitt (executive producer)
- Starring: Richard Grieco; Michael Ironside; Sean Young
- Cinematography: Gerald B. Wolfe
- Edited by: Mark Sanders
- Music by: Chris Squire
- Release date: 1995
- Running time: 93 minutes
- Language: English

Bolt is a 1995 American drama film directed by Henri Colline and George Mendeluk and starring Richard Grieco in the title role as a New Jersey biker. After fleeing west to escape a gang war, Bolt becomes romantically involved with Native American Patty Deerheart (Sean Young), and is compelled to battle to protect her family from a land runner. The appearance of former gang rival Billy Niles (Michael Ironside) on the reservation causes the conflict to escalate into a violent climax. It was released on DVD as Rebel Run in 1999.

The movie received generally poor reviews, and Sean Young later said that the cast referred to the film as "Blot".

== Cast ==
- Richard Grieco as Bolt
- Michael Ironside as Billy Niles
- Sean Young as Patty Deerheart
- Griffith Brewer as Old Man
- Jason Cavalier as John
- Brian Dooley as Sheriff Baby
- Ted Whittall as Tector
- Alan Shearman as Matrix
- Lorne Brass as Eagle
- Roc Lafortune as Biker
- Jean Frenette as Bunker
- Frédéric Gilles as Biker 2
- Mickey Jones (uncredited)
