= John Cork =

American film producer

- Born: Montgomery, Alabama, U.S.
- Occupations: Author; screenwriter; documentary filmmaker; producer

John Cork is an American author, screenwriter, and documentary film director and producer.

== Career ==
An avid James Bond fan, Cork has produced, written (along with Bruce Scivally), and directed more than thirty documentaries for MGM's releases of the James Bond films on DVD, Blu-ray, and streaming platforms. As an author, he and Scivally have written the biographies of Ian Fleming, Cubby Broccoli, and Harry Saltzman. Collectively, they have conducted over one hundred and fifty interviews with the creative talents behind the 007 films. They also contributed to The Ultimate James Bond: An Interactive Dossier, a CD-ROM for MGM Interactive.

Cork serves as president of the multi-media production company Cloverland; the company has produced multiple feature-length documentaries and over 300 short documentaries since 1999, many of them "making of" featurettes on classic films for DVD, Blu-ray and digital video releases.

In 2002, Cork and Bruce Scivally wrote the book James Bond: The Legacy which documents the history of the James Bond legacy as well as importance in popular culture, global affairs and current events from the time it started up until present time. In 2003, John Cork also co-wrote the book Bond Girls Are Forever: The Women of James Bond with actress Maryam d'Abo. With Collin Stutz, Cork co-authored The James Bond Encyclopedia, first published in 2007, updated in 2009, and 2014.

Cork wrote and directed the documentary, "You Belong to Me: Sex, Race, and Murder in the South" for producers Judith Hagin, Kitty Potapow, and Hilary Saltzman, delving into the murder of the white Dr. LeRoy Adams by the black woman, Ruby McCollum in Live Oak, Florida in 1952. The film played in festivals in 2014 and was released on video and streaming platforms in 2015.

In 2017, Penguin Random House and Ian Fleming Publications asked Cork to write new introductions to three of the original James Bond novels, Casino Royale, Live and Let Die, and Goldfinger.

Cork is also a member of The Ian Fleming Foundation, a group dedicated to the study of Ian Fleming and his works.

=== Screenwriting ===
Cork, who is a screenwriter, has penned the civil rights drama, The Long Walk Home, starring Sissy Spacek and Whoopi Goldberg, and has written screenplays for many major film studios. Bruce Scivally has worked for several motion picture production companies, co-edited The Special Effects and Stunts Guide, and was the Production Coordinator for the 2001 Academy Awards Show. Both authors live in Los Angeles.

In addition, in 2007, for the release of the Spider-Man 2.1 DVD, Cork and Bruce Scivally wrote and compiled the Spidey Sense 2.1-trivia track, a closed captioning feature on Disc 1 of the DVD, which includes integrated pop-ups that provides information about the Spider-Man actors, directors, production, comic books and Spider-Man legacy. The feature is available via closed captioning that plays during the course of key scenes throughout the film.

== Personal life ==
John Cork was born in Montgomery, Alabama. He currently splits his time between Florida and California. He was married to singer Nicole Dillenberg from 1994 until 2014. They have one son, Jimmy Cork. Both Cork and his ex-wife are graduates of the University of Southern California School of Cinema-Television.

Cork has said that he and his ex-wife honeymooned at Goldeneye, the secluded home in Jamaica where Ian Fleming wrote his 14 James Bond books. Goldeneye's owner, Island Records founder and hotelier Chris Blackwell, who served as location manager for Dr. No (1962), waived the rental for the three-bedroom villa as a wedding present, according to Cork.
