= Mobsters (film) =

1991 film by Michael Karbelnikoff

- Theatrical release poster
- Directed by: Michael Karbelnikoff
- Screenplay by: Michael Mahern; Nicholas Kazan
- Story by: Michael Mahern
- Produced by: Steve Roth
- Starring: Christian Slater; Patrick Dempsey; Richard Grieco; Costas Mandylor; F. Murray Abraham; Lara Flynn Boyle; Michael Gambon; Anthony Quinn
- Cinematography: Lajos Koltai
- Edited by: Joe Augustine
- Music by: Michael Small
- Distributed by: Universal Pictures
- Release date: July 26, 1991
- Running time: 104 minutes
- Language: English
- Budget: $23 million
- Box office: $20.2 million

Mobsters is a 1991 American crime drama film directed by Michael Karbelnikoff. It details the creation of The Commission. Set in New York City, taking place from 1917 to 1931, it is a semi-fictitious account of the rise of Charles "Lucky" Luciano, Meyer Lansky, Frank Costello, and Benjamin "Bugsy" Siegel. The film stars Christian Slater as Luciano, Patrick Dempsey as Lansky, Costas Mandylor as Costello and Richard Grieco as Siegel, with Michael Gambon, Anthony Quinn, Lara Flynn Boyle and F. Murray Abraham in supporting roles.

== Synopsis ==
The film recounts the rise of four infamous gangsters: Lucky Luciano, Meyer Lansky, Bugsy Siegel and Frank Costello. The four begin as members of youth gangs on the streets of New York, fighting and hustling as they learn the rules of the street and form strong friendships that benefit them as they grow into their teenage years. The beginning of Prohibition provides them with an entry into organized crime, and under the mentorship of seasoned gangsters such as Arnold Rothstein, they build up a lucrative bootlegging empire.

Despite their success, the four come into conflict with the established leaders of the Mafia, who dislike the idea of working with other criminal organizations to maximize profits and compete with each other for power and influence. Believing that the Mafia must restructure itself in order to thrive, Luciano and Lansky recruit Siegel and Costello to eliminate their bosses and assume control, setting up the Commission and dividing the New York underworld between five families.

== Cast ==
- Christian Slater as Charlie "Lucky" Luciano
- Patrick Dempsey as Meyer Lansky
- Richard Grieco as Benjamin "Bugsy" Siegel
- Costas Mandylor as Frank Costello
- F. Murray Abraham as Arnold Rothstein
- Michael Gambon as Don Faranzano
- Anthony Quinn as Don Masseria
- Lara Flynn Boyle as Mara Motes
- Chris Penn as Tommy Reina
- Nicholas Sadler as Mad Dog Coll
- Andy Romano as Antonio Luciano
- Robert Z'Dar as Rocco
- Frank Collison as Catania
- Rodney Eastman as Joey
- Joe Viterelli as Joe Profaci
- Titus Welliver as Al Capone

== Reception ==
On Rotten Tomatoes, the film holds an approval rating of 9% based on 33 reviews with a mean of 4.2 of a possible ten. The website's critics consensus reads: "Despite an abundance of style and some big names, Mobsters can't escape its empty plotting, numbing violence, and Gangster Movie 101 concepts." Audiences polled by CinemaScore gave the film an average grade of "B" on an A+ to F scale.

Variety wrote that "Mobsters resembles a cart-before-the-horse case of putting marketing ahead of film-making, as the seemingly can't-miss premise of teen-heartthrob gangsters gets lost in self-important direction, a shoddy script and muddled storytelling." Roger Ebert wrote that the movie's violence and bloodshed were so over the top that "they undermine the rest of the film, and approach parody"; he gave it two and a half out of four stars.

Both Anthony Quinn and Christian Slater were nominated for the Golden Raspberry Award for Worst Supporting Actor for their performances, with Slater also being nominated for his performance in Robin Hood: Prince of Thieves, but both lost to Dan Aykroyd for Nothing But Trouble.

Slater said he was hoping that the film would be like the much more successful Bugsy, but this did not happen: "Our movie ended up in bits and pieces all over the world," he said. "They had different versions flying to Japan, Europe and every other place. There were extended versions, shortened versions; all kinds of weird versions. In my opinion, audiences never got to see a full film. Somewhere in all that mess, there was a legitimate story. It was there in the script."

=== Box office ===
The film debuted at No. 2 behind Terminator 2: Judgment Day, but failed to make a profit.
