= Tomcat: Dangerous Desires =

- VHS cover
- Directed by: Paul Donovan
- Written by: Paul Donovan
- Produced by: William Vince; Robert Vince
- Starring: Richard Grieco; Maryam D'Abo; Natalie Radford
- Music by: Graeme Coleman
- Distributed by: Republic Pictures
- Release date: 1993
- Running time: 96 minutes
- Countries: United States; Canada
- Language: English

Tomcat: Dangerous Desires is a direct-to-video 1993 erotic thriller film directed by Paul Donovan and starring Richard Grieco and Maryam D'Abo.

== Synopsis ==
Tom (Grieco), who suffers from a rare DNA degenerative condition, becomes the subject of a secretive, inter-species experiment. To treat his disease, his doctor (D'Abo) decides to inject him a part of feline brain. While the feline injections have restored his health, Tom slowly transforms as a result.

== Cast ==
- Richard Grieco as Tom
- Natalie Radford as Imogen
- Maryam d'Abo as Jacki
- Serge Houde as Dr Pace

== Production ==
- Republic Pictures Productions – Domestic Theatrical Distributor
- Saban Entertainment – Foreign Distribution Sales
- Republic Pictures Home Video – Domestic Video Distributor

== Review ==
Injected with a serum containing the genetic traits of a cat, Tom is restored to health and transformed into a sinewy hunk with superhuman agility and a decidedly feline demeanor -- complete with a savage, murderous sex drive. Though this added trait makes him doubly attractive to his doctor, it also compels him to destroy every woman with whom he mates. Though the majority of the film's tension is of the sexual kind (and quite steamy at that), the more horrific plot elements are well-driven by Grieco's manic intensity -- until the disappointing climax, which shows the earmarks of a writer in over his head.

—Cavett Binion, The New York Times
