= Not a Penny More, Not a Penny Less =

Novel by Jeffrey Archer

- First edition (UK)
- Author: Jeffrey Archer
- Language: English
- Publisher: Jonathan Cape (UK); Doubleday (US)
- Publication date: 1976
- Publication place: UK
- Media type: Print (Hardcover & Paperback)
- Pages: 310
- ISBN: 0-224-01309-2

Not a Penny More, Not a Penny Less was Jeffrey Archer's first novel, first published in 1976. It was said to have been inspired by Archer's real-life experience of near-bankruptcy.

== Synopsis ==
Harvey Metcalfe, a Polish immigrant to the United States, rises from messenger boy to corporate magnate by combining ruthless business skills with little loyalty. Over 40 years, he mastered shady dealmaking, and by the 1960s, he became a multi-millionaire.

Taking advantage of a British decision to allow companies to claim North Sea oil drilling rights with little money down, Metcalfe creates Prospecta Oil, a paper company designed to look good and bring in investors, to be left hanging out to dry when the bottom drops out. Metcalfe's agents hire David Kesler, a Harvard MBA who talks up the company to the four protagonists: Stephen Bradley, an American professor at the University of Oxford; Dr Robin Oakley, a Harley Street doctor; Jean-Pierre Lamanns, a French art dealer with a gallery in London; and James Brigsley, heir to an earldom.

They each buy Prospecta stock and Metcalfe (indirectly) sells out at the top of the market. The stock crashes, and the four are left with major losses. But Metcalfe has cheated the wrong men. Bradley learns of Metcalfe's responsibility; discovering that there is no legal recourse, he organizes the four to steal the money back, using Harvey's interests and weaknesses. All four are to come up with plans, and three quickly do. James, however, is unable to. He is more successful at courting Anne Summerton, an American model.

Jean-Pierre is successful at getting Harvey to buy a fake Van Gogh painting — he has always wanted one. When Harvey heads to Monte Carlo on vacation, a pill in his drink at the Casino causes severe abdominal pain which is made to look like a gallstone, and Robin operates, though barely breaking the skin, and collects a large bill. Stephen impersonates an Oxford official, as do the others, and gets Harvey to think he is getting an honorary degree in exchange for a contribution. James, though unable to come up with a plan of his own, has been crucial to the success of the others' plans — and when he meets Anne's father, he learns that he is none other than Harvey.

James instructs the others to execute a complex financial fraud, and flies them to Boston for the wedding as ushers, though not giving formal invitations. They learn who the bride's father is. The wedding cheque from Harvey, plus ransacking Harvey's greenhouses for wedding flowers, reduces the million dollar debt to $1.24, though Stephen sulks on the plane home about the missing money.

They land in London to learn that a new BP oil field has been discovered next to Prospecta Oil's tract, sending Prospecta shares to record highs. They now have the stolen million back, and the shares are worth well over a million. Stephen proposes they figure out how to give the stolen million back.

== Adaptations ==
Don Sharp said he worked on a version of the book in the 1970s but at that stage there was confusion about who had the rights.

In 1980, the novel was dramatised on BBC Radio 4 in a 7-part series starring Stratford Johns as Harvey Metcalfe, Paul Darrow as Stephen Bradley, Francis Matthews as Adrian Tryner, Edward de Souza as Jean-Pierre Lamanns, Jeremy Clyde as Lord James Brigsley, Gordon Reid as Detective Sergeant Ryder and Lesley-Anne Down as Anne Summerton. It was adapted by Betty Davies and narrated by the author. The series was re-broadcast 24–30 December 1984 on BBC Radio 4 and 29 April - 7 May 2025 on BBC Radio 4 Extra.

In 1990, the book was adapted as a four-hour, two-part mini-series on BBC One directed by Clive Donner, with Ed Asner as Harvey Metcalfe, Ed Begley Jr. as Stephen Bradley, François-Éric Gendron as Jean-Pierre Lamanns, Brian Protheroe as James Brigsley and Nicholas Jones as Dr. Robin Oakley, and also starring Jenny Agutter as Jill Albery and Maryam d'Abo as Anne Summerton.

A text adventure game adaptation based on the book was developed and published by Domark, and released in 1987 for the Amstrad CPC, Atari XL, BBC Micro, Commodore 64 and ZX Spectrum computers.
