= It Was Him or Us =

- Genre: Drama; Thriller
- Written by: Richard Lawton
- Directed by: Robert Iscove
- Starring: Richard Grieco; Ann Jillian; Monique Lanier; Richard Masur
- Theme music composer: John Frizzell
- Country of origin: United States
- Original language: English

Production
- Executive producer: Daniel H. Blatt
- Producers: Robert Iscove; Lynn Raynor
- Production location: Salt Lake City
- Cinematography: John Beymer
- Editor: Martin Nicholson
- Running time: 95 minutes
- Production companies: MDT Productions; Warner Bros. Television

Original release
- Network: CBS
- Release: November 21, 1995

It Was Him or Us (a.k.a. Love and Terror) is an American made for television film which aired on CBS on November 21, 1995. It stars Richard Grieco, Ann Jillian, Monique Lanier, and Richard Masur.

== Plot ==
One night in a small town, Peggy Wilson, and her daughter, Carrie, get up and leave Peggy's abusive husband, and Carrie's father, Buddy. As they try to leave, Buddy comes to the pickup begging Peggy to forgive him, and asking Carrie to open the door. Unmoved by his pleas, Peggy points a gun at Buddy, telling him to stay away from them, as they drive away.

Eighteen years later, Peggy is now living in Salt Lake City with her new husband, Walter Pomeroy. They have two sons, Stevie age 10 and Jesse age 8. Her daughter Carrie, now a single mother to a 5-year-old girl named Jenna, is living with them and complains about not having a boyfriend or husband. Carrie then goes to apply for a job in an office at a construction site, where she meets good-looking young construction worker Gene Shepard, who asks her out. When he comes to pick Carrie up for their first date, the family seems to approve of him because of his kindness, but Peggy makes the comment that she wished Gene had called first, to which Carrie tells her mom to be nice as she leaves with Gene. During their date at a pizza restaurant, the two end up having sex in the bathroom, claiming they were meant for each other.

A few days later, Carrie invites Gene to a party at a bar with her friends, but Gene refuses because he doesn't want to "hang out with losers". Carrie goes to the party alone, and she dances with a friend of hers, Scottie, but Gene, who had secretly followed Carrie to the bar, appears and beats up Scottie in a violent rage. The bar manager kicks Gene out, and later, when Carrie tries to go into her house, Gene violently pulls her away from the house, and yells at her until Peggy comes out and tells Gene to leave Carrie alone. Gene then leaves, running over their mailbox with his car, and Carrie blames Peggy for trying to help.

The next day, Gene's mom, Maggie, comes over and asks Carrie to come have lunch with Gene and her at their house, which she does. While there, Gene apologizes for getting violent, and promises to someday marry her and buy a house for her, him, and Jenna; but when Gene goes to work later, he learns that his boss has fired him because Peggy found out that Gene had a history of violence, and reported it to his boss. Gene and Carrie go to Peggy's house, where Gene expresses his anger about getting fired. Carrie calls her mom crazy, and blames her for getting Gene fired. As a result, Carrie decides that she and Jenna are going to move in with Gene and Maggie.

Three months later, Gene, Carrie and Jenna meet Peggy, Walter, and the boys in the park to have a picnic. Initially, things seems to go well, but when Carrie and Peggy take Jenna to a merry-go-round, Gene tries to call Carrie, but she doesn't hear him. When they return home later that night, he takes his anger out on Carrie, accusing her of trying to ignore him at the park and starts throwing things around the house. Carrie grabs Jenna and leaves, but as she and Jenna get in the car, Gene comes out with a baseball bat and smashes the windshield. The police come and take Gene to jail, and Walter and Peggy show up; Peggy tells Maggie her son is sick, and runs into the house and embraces Carrie and Jenna.

The next day, Carrie visits Gene in jail and tells him she won't see him anymore. However, during a Saturday visit to the mall with Scottie, she appears to be having second thoughts about leaving Gene, despite Scottie's attempts to convince her otherwise. Suddenly, Gene appears, having been released on bail, and violently attacks Scottie. Now realizing her mom was right all along that Gene is a violent, irredeemable man, Carrie tells Gene to leave her alone, and warns him that she can put him in jail for a very long time.

On Sunday, Carrie receives a call from Gene asking her to forgive him, but she lies to Gene, saying that she is seeing somebody else, and that the person is coming over to meet her. Enraged, Gene grabs a gun and goes to the house, telling Peggy that he's there to kill her, Carrie, Walter, Jenna, Stevie, and Jesse. He hears Carrie downstairs on the phone with Scottie, and rushes down to order her upstairs. Jesse and Stevie manage to hide in an air vent downstairs, and find a secret exit from a wooded window. They soon notice Walter returning home from a hunting trip and they try to warn him, but he doesn't hear them. Walter enters the house and is also taken hostage by Gene. However, the boys are found by Scottie, who frees them and takes them to the police. When the police arrive at the house, Lt. Washington asks the boys about what happened, so the boys tell her about their sister's boyfriend coming in with a gun threatening to kill everyone. Gene then appears at the door and the police draw their guns, but Gene puts Jenna down and returns inside the house while Jenna walks safely to the police and her uncles.

As night falls, the police try to do everything to get Gene to cooperate with them, even bringing Maggie to the house to talk to him, but nothing works. Walter tries to stop Gene by hiding in the bedroom closet and jumping onto him from behind, but in the ensuing struggle, Gene knocks him out cold with his gun. While Gene grabs Carrie and begins to talk to her, telling her how much he loves her, Peggy sneaks into the basement and talks to Lt. Washington. Washington tells her to try to sneak out the exit her sons did, but Peggy tells her that she won't leave her daughter and husband alone, and she sneaks into her room and grabs Walter's gun. Carrie refuses to listen to Gene's claims of loving her, and ultimately denounces Gene as a monster who doesn't know what love is, causing Gene to prepare to kill Carrie and vow that he will do so while she looks at him, so that they can be together in the afterlife. However, Carrie instead puts her eye focus on Peggy, who enters the room with Walter's gun and aims it at Gene. Gene turns around to look at Peggy, and at that moment, he realizes what's about to happen to him, just as Peggy fires five shots at him, ultimately killing Gene.

As the sun rises, Peggy and Carrie walk out of the house while the police bring out the bodies of Walter and Gene. Lt. Washington then tells Peggy that Walter will be all right, adding that she could have lost her life while in there, to which Peggy replies "When it comes to your kids, you have to do what you have to do" while Maggie is devastated of her son's death. She then returns to her children and granddaughter, and the film ends.

== Cast ==
- Ann Jillian as Peggy Wilson-Pomeroy – one of the main characters who faced an abusive first marriage to Buddy Wilson but luckily managed to escape and find a happy 2nd marriage to Walter Pomeroy. Mother of Carrie Wilson, Stevie Pomeroy, and Jesse Pomeroy and grandmother of Jenna Wilson she must do everything she can to protect them from Carrie's abusive boyfriend Gene Shepard.
- Richard Grieco as Gene Shepard – The film's antagonist and Carrie's boyfriend who is a construction worker. He starts off as a nice guy but later turns abusive and takes Carrie and her family hostage in their home when she attempts to break up with him.
- Monique Lanier as Carrie Wilson – Another of the film's main characters who starts a relationship with Gene Shepard, the film's villain. She is the oldest and only daughter of Peggy, stepdaughter of Walter, older half-sister of Jesse and Stevie, and the mother of Jenna from a failed relationship. She escaped from her abusive father Buddy Wilson with her mom Peggy many years ago. She initially does not see Gene as a danger and only thinks Peggy is obsessing over the past until Gene takes her and her family hostage after she tries to break up with him.
- Richard Masur as Walter Pomeroy – 2nd husband of Peggy, stepfather of Carrie, father of Stevie and Jesse, and step grandfather of Jenna. He owns a flower shop and is an avid hunter.
- Brooke Ashley as Jenna Wilson – Carrie's daughter from a failed relationship and the granddaughter of Peggy, step-granddaughter of Walter, and niece of Stevie and Jesse,
- Spencer Treat Clark as Jesse Pomeroy – Youngest son and child of Walter and Peggy, younger brother of Stevie, and youngest half-brother of Carrie, and uncle of Jenna. He likes the outdoors and hockey. Luckily, he and his brother manage to escape Gene and go and get the police with their sister's friend Scotty.
- David Gallagher as Stevie Pomeroy – Walter's oldest child, Peggy's middle child, the oldest younger half-brother of Carrie, the older brother of Jesse, and the uncle of Jenna. He likes the outdoors and hockey. Luckily, he and his brother manage to escape Gene and go and get the police with their sister's friend Scotty.
- Bette Ford as Maggie Shepard – Divorced mother of Gene who she lives with and tries to control his anger issues.
- Wil Wheaton as Scottie – a friend of Carrie's from school who works at her parents' flower shop. He goes with Stevie and Jesse to get the police when Gene takes the family hostage inside their house. Although it is never revealed the film implies that he might be gay.
- Lorraine Toussaint as Lt. Washington – a female negotiator cop who comes to the house and help things out when Gene takes Peggy, Walter, and Carrie hostage.
- Brett Palmer as Buddy Wilson – Peggy's abusive first husband and father of Carrie and grandfather of Jenna.

== Reception ==
The film was reportedly based on a true story.

A TV Guide review wrote: "Despite competent performances, this 1995 TVdrama starring Ann Jillian, Richard Grieco and Richard Masur lacks credibility in its portrayal of one woman's crusade to protect her daughter from domestic abuse." Another review stated, "A well-meaning yet predictable madefor-TV movie about domestic violence. Ann Jillian plays a former victim-turned-counsellor who becomes convinced that her estranged daughter (Monique Lanier) is drifting into a dangerous relationship with Richard Grieco. Director Robert Iscove does his best with a cliché-ridden script and produces a suitably tense finale. Grieco delivers a believably sleazy turn and there is a reliable performance from Richard Masur, but it’s hard to work up much sympathy for Jillian."
