= The Sea Change =

The Sea Change is a 1998 British-Spanish comedy film directed by Michael Bray and starring Maryam d'Abo, Sean Chapman and Ray Winstone. The screenplay concerns a workaholic British banker who neglects his girlfriend.

== Premise ==
A workaholic British banker neglects his girlfriend. However, after his plane is delayed and he is forced to spend time in Barcelona he adopts a new life attitude.

== Main cast ==
- Maryam d'Abo – Alison
- Sean Chapman – Rupert
- Ray Winstone – Chas
- Andrée Bernard – Sarah
- Germán Montaner – Mr. Caldeiro
- Amparo Moreno – Mrs. Caldeiro
