= John Glen (director) =

English film director and editor

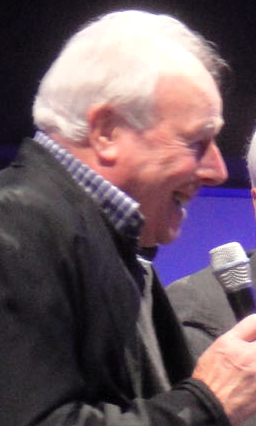
- Glen in 2012
- Born: 15 May 1932 (age 94); Sunbury-on-Thames, England
- Occupations: Film director; film editor
- Years active: 1948–2015

John Glen (born 15 May 1932) is an English retired film director and editor. He is best known for his work on the James Bond series, firstly by editing a number of earlier Bond films, and later directing all of the five films released in the 1980s. He has directed more Bond films than any other director.

== Life and career ==
Glen began in the film industry as a messenger boy in 1945. By the late 1940s, he was working in the visual and sound editorial departments of Shepperton Studios for films produced by Alexander Korda, such as The Third Man (1949) and The Wooden Horse (1950). Moving up the ranks, Glen made his picture editorial debut on a documentary series titled Chemistry for Six Forms in 1961, and his directorial debut on the TV series Man in a Suitcase in 1968 (directing the episode "Somebody Loses, Somebody ... Wins?").

During the 1960s and 1970s, Glen served as a film editor and second unit director, working on such films as Superman (1978) and The Wild Geese (1978); he also contributed to three James Bond films: On Her Majesty's Secret Service (1969), The Spy Who Loved Me (1977) and Moonraker (1979). Following the release of Moonraker, Glen was promoted to the rank of official director of the series; he went on to direct all five Bond films of the 1980s. He is the most prolific director of the series to date, with five films, one more than Guy Hamilton.

After Bond, Glen continued to direct, with credits including Christopher Columbus: The Discovery (1992) and The Point Men (2001). He also directed 7 episodes of the science-fiction television series Space Precinct (1994–95). In 2001, he published his memoir, For My Eyes Only.

== Directorial style ==
Glen's films contain a recurring motif in the form of a startled pigeon that makes the actor (as well as the audience) jump; it is especially noticeable in his five James Bond films. Variations exist; in some cases, the animal is a cat (A View to a Kill) or a monkey (The Living Daylights). In addition, all of Glen's Bond films feature a character who dies by falling from a height, in a sequence commonly accompanied by the same "male scream" sound effect.

Glen often reused actors in his films. In his autobiography, he wrote that he wanted to cast Timothy Dalton in Christopher Columbus: The Discovery, but Dalton left the project before shooting commenced; Glen wondered whether – following an argument at the end of shooting on Licence to Kill – Dalton did not wish to appear in any more of his films. Several other cast members from the Glen Bond films appear in Christopher Columbus: the Discovery; among them are Robert Davi (who played Franz Sanchez in Licence to Kill), Benicio del Toro (who played Dario in Licence to Kill), and Michael Gothard (who played Emile Leopold Locque in For Your Eyes Only). He cast Maryam d'Abo in three projects, including The Living Daylights, because she was one of his favourite actresses.

By far his most frequent acting collaborator was Roger Moore, who worked with Glen on eleven films.

== Filmography ==
| Year | Film | Director | Editor | Second unit director |
|---|---|---|---|---|
| 1969 | Baby Love | | Yes | |
| 1969 | The Italian Job | | | uncredited |
| 1969 | On Her Majesty's Secret Service | | Yes | Yes |
| 1971 | Murphy's War | | Yes | uncredited |
| 1971 | Catlow | | | Yes |
| 1972 | Pulp | | Yes | |
| 1972 | Sitting Target | | Yes | |
| 1973 | A Doll's House | | Yes | |
| 1974 | Gold | | Yes | Yes |
| 1974 | Dead Cert | | Yes | |
| 1975 | Conduct Unbecoming | | Yes | |
| 1976 | Shout at the Devil | | Yes | |
| 1977 | The Spy Who Loved Me | | Yes | Yes |
| 1977 | Seven Nights in Japan | | Yes | |
| 1978 | The Wild Geese | | Yes | Yes |
| 1978 | Superman | | | Yes |
| 1979 | Moonraker | | Yes | Yes |
| 1980 | The Sea Wolves | | Yes | |
| 1981 | For Your Eyes Only | Yes | | |
| 1983 | Octopussy | Yes | | |
| 1985 | A View to a Kill | Yes | | |
| 1987 | The Living Daylights | Yes | | |
| 1989 | Licence to Kill | Yes | | |
| 1990 | Checkered Flag | Yes | | |
| 1992 | Aces: Iron Eagle III | Yes | | |
| 1992 | Christopher Columbus: The Discovery | Yes | | |
| 2001 | The Point Men | Yes | | |
