= Richard Parnell Habersham =

American actor and businessman

Richard Parnell Habersham is an American actor in theatre and film, as well as, a real estate broker in New York City. He was born in Manhattan and raised in Harlem.

== Biography ==
Habersham has appeared in theatre productions such as Ron Mark's fantasy farce Panache! and on Broadway in Joe Turner's Come and Gone, the Tony Award nominated drama written by Pulitzer Prize winning playwright August Wilson. Habersham played the role of Travis Younger in the Union Square Theatre 25th Anniversary Off Broadway production of Lorraine Hansberry's A Raisin in the Sun.

In film, Habersham played Eddie in Spike Lee's Do the Right Thing, Theodore Cotter in The Long Walk Home, the young Jake Branch in the black-and-white independent feature Lou, Pat & Joe D, and Cathy's younger brother in The Cabinet of Dr. Ramirez, a "freewheeling musical comedy horror spoof" directed by Peter Sellars.

Habersham earned his B.A. in history from the University of Virginia and his M.S. in real estate development from Columbia University's Graduate School of Architecture. The history of the American Civil War is one of his particular interests.

In 2019, Habersham ran for New York's 13th Congressional District. He also launched a nonprofit organization, solutionsNOW, with the goal of servicing members of that neighborhood.

== Filmography ==
Year	Title	Role	Notes
1989	Do the Right Thing	Eddie	
1990	The Long Walk Home	Theodore Cotter	
1991	The Cabinet of Dr. Ramirez	Cathy's Younger Brother	
