= Richard Grieco =

American actor (born 1965)

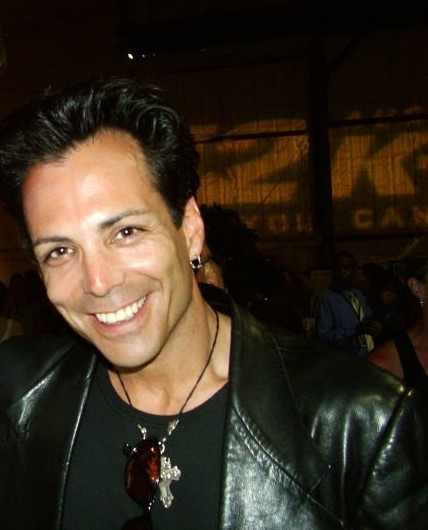
- Grieco in 2006
- Born: Richard John Grieco Jr. March 23, 1965 (age 61); Watertown, New York, U.S.
- Occupations: Actor; painter; former fashion model
- Years active: 1985–present
- Children: 1
- Website: www.griecoart.com

Richard John Grieco Junior. (born March 23, 1965) is an American actor, artist, and former fashion model. He played Detective Dennis Booker in the popular Fox series 21 Jump Street (1988–89) and its spin-off Booker (1989–90). He has also starred in various films, including If Looks Could Kill and Mobsters (both 1991). He has voiced characters in several video games and appeared as either himself or his 21 Jump Street character in several films and television shows. Since 2009, he worked as a painter, working in a style he calls abstract emotionalism.

== Early life ==
Richard Grieco was born in Watertown, New York, the son of Richard and Carolyn (née O'Reilly) Grieco. He is of Italian and Irish descent. He has one son, Dylan Justice Grieco (also known as Dylan Justice Sissons).

== Career ==
=== Modeling, TV and film ===
Grieco worked as a model for Armani, Calvin Klein and Chanel. His first television role was as Rick Gardner on One Life to Live from February to August 1987. In 1988, Grieco began appearing as Detective Dennis Booker on the shows 21 Jump Street and its spinoff Booker. Grieco's feature film debut was as Michael Corben in If Looks Could Kill (1991) and has appeared in numerous films since then. Later in 1991, he played the young Jewish bootlegger and mobster Benjamin "Bugsy" Siegel in the film Mobsters. He also appeared in the TV series Marker in 1995. He played himself in the 1998 film A Night at the Roxbury as well as in an episode of the FX comedy It's Always Sunny in Philadelphia.

=== Music ===
Grieco began a singing career in 1994 with the Dunmire Band. He signed to a German label and released a CD, Waiting for the Sky to Fall, in 1995; he re-released the album in 2011, making it available on streaming services such as iTunes and Spotify. In 2004, he formed the band Wasteland Park with music manager Cheryl Bogart.

=== Art ===
In 2009, several years after being encouraged to do so by Dennis Hopper, Grieco publicly revealed that he has been painting since 1991 and sold his first painting for $10,900. He calls his work "Abstract Emotionalism."

== Filmography ==
=== Film ===
| Year | Title | Role | Notes |
|---|---|---|---|
| 1991 | If Looks Could Kill | Michael Corben | |
| 1991 | Mobsters | Benny "Bugsy" Siegel | |
| 1993 | Born to Run | Nicky Donatello | Television film |
| 1993 | Tomcat: Dangerous Desires | Tom | |
| 1993 | Nick's Game | Del Pizzo, Nick | Television film |
| 1994 | Sin and Redemption | Jim McDaniels | Television film |
| 1994 | Bolt | Bolt | Video |
| 1995 | A Vow to Kill | Eric | Television film |
| 1995 | The Demolitionist | 'Mad Dog' Burne | |
| 1995 | Suspicious Agenda | Tony Castagne | |
| 1995 | It Was Him or Us | Gene Shepard | Television film |
| 1996 | Inhumanoid | Adam | Television film |
| 1996 | Heaven or Vegas | Navy | |
| 1997 | When Time Expires | Travis Beck | Television film |
| 1997 | Against the Law | Rex | |
| 1997 | The Journey: Absolution | Sergeant Bradley | |
| 1997 | Mutual Needs | Brandon Collier | |
| 1998 | Sinbad: The Battle of the Dark Knights | Sinbad | |
| 1998 | A Night at the Roxbury | Himself | |
| 1998 | Captive | Joe Goodis | Television film |
| 1998 | Garden of Evil | Dean | |
| 1998 | Blackheart | Ray | |
| 1999 | Ultimate Deception | Bobby Woodkin | Television film |
| 2000 | The Apostate | Michael Killan | |
| 2000 | Point Doom | Rick Hansen | |
| 2001 | Vital Parts | Ty Kinnick | |
| 2001 | Sweet Revenge | Frank | |
| 2001 | Final Payback | Joey Randall | |
| 2001 | Manhattan Midnight | Midnight | |
| 2001 | Death, Deceit and Destiny Aboard the Orient Express | Jack Chase | |
| 2001 | Last Cry | J.C. Gale | Video |
| 2002 | Fish Don't Blink | Pete | |
| 2003 | Book of Days | Mr. Finch | Television film |
| 2003 | Evil Breed: The Legend of Samhain | Mark | |
| 2003 | Webs | Dean | |
| 2004 | Phantom Force | Mark Dupree | Television film |
| 2004 | Dead Easy | Simon Storm | |
| 2005 | Kiss Kiss Bang Bang | B-Movie Actor | |
| 2006 | Forget About It | Anthony Amato | |
| 2007 | Raiders of the Damned | Dr. Lewis | |
| 2011 | Almighty Thor | Loki | Television film |
| 2013 | AE Apocalypse Earth | Captain Sam Crowe | Video |
| 2014 | 22 Jump Street | Dennis Booker | |
| 2014 | After Midnight | Dr. Sam Hubbard | |
| 2014 | Viral Video | FishyKiller | Short |
| 2015 | Cats Dancing on Jupiter | Derek Stockton | |
| 2015 | A House Is Not a Home | Rafkin | |
| 2015 | Viral Video 2 | FishyKiller | Short |
| 2016 | The Chemist | Stone | |
| 2017 | Eliza Sherman's Revenge | Himself | |
| 2017 | Halloween Pussy Trap Kill! Kill! | Dale | |
| 2018 | Loan Me a Dime | Walter Stone | |
| 2018 | Fury of the Fist and the Golden Fleece | The Albanian | |
| 2018 | Minutes to Midnight | Sheriff Wyatt | |
| 2018 | Dick Dickster | Himself | |
| 2018 | Impact Event | Justice Outlaw | |
| 2019 | Clinton Road | Ghost Truck Driver | |
| 2019 | Art of the Dead | Douglas Winter | |
| 2019 | I'm Offended | Richard | Television film |
| 2020 | Dream Round | Sean McLaw | |
| 2020 | Attack of the Unknown | Vernon | |
| 2020 | Stay Off the App | Brooks | |
| 2021 | Whack the Don | Nick | |
| 2021 | Jungle Run | Nicholas Kiri | |
| 2021 | Desert Moon | Sheriff Del | |
| 2022 | Night of the Tommyknockers | Dirk | |

=== Television ===
| Year | Title | Role | Notes |
|---|---|---|---|
| 1987 | One Life to Live | Rick Gardner | Episode: "Episode #1.4786" |
| 1987 | Rags to Riches | Billy Gallento | Episode: "Hunk in the House" |
| 1988 | Who's the Boss? | Mauritzio | Episode: "All in the Famiglia" |
| 1988 | The Facts of Life | Ben | Episode: "Big Apple Blues" |
| 1988–89 | 21 Jump Street | Detective Dennis Booker | Recurring cast (seasons 3-4) |
| 1989–90 | Booker | Detective Dennis Booker | Main cast |
| 1994–96 | Gargoyles | Anthony "Tony" Dracon | Voice, recurring role |
| 1994 | Sin and Redemption | | made-for-television movie |
| 1995 | Marker | Richard DeMorra | Main cast |
| 1995 | Fantastic Four | Ghost Rider | Voice, episode: "When Calls Galactus"; credited as Richard Greico |
| 1996 | The Incredible Hulk | Ghost Rider | Voice, episode: "Innocent Blood" |
| 2006–07 | Veronica Mars | Steve Botando | Recurring cast (season 3) |
| 2009 | Gone Country 3 | Himself | Main cast (season 3) |
| 2010 | Gigolos | N/A | Creator and executive producer |
| 2016 | It's Always Sunny in Philadelphia | Himself | Episode: "Dee Made a Smut Film" |
| 2021 | Paper Empire | Santiago Ochoa | Episode: "Digital Limbo" |

=== Video games ===
| Year | Title | Role | Notes |
|---|---|---|---|
| 2011 | Ultimate Marvel vs. Capcom 3 | Ghost Rider | |

=== Web ===
| Year | Title | Role | Notes |
|---|---|---|---|
| 2014 | Viral Video | Fishykiller | Short film on Trisha Paytas' YouTube channel |
| 2015 | Viral Video 2 | Fishykiller | Short film on Trisha Paytas' YouTube channel |
