= Faith Rivera =

American singer-songwriter

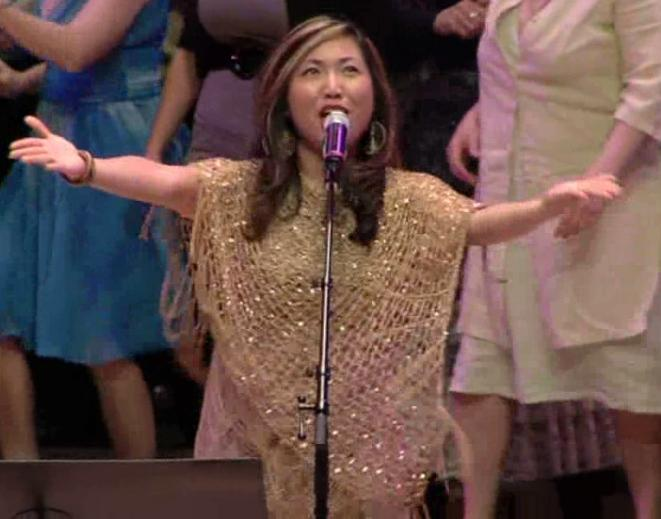
Faith Rivera at the Winspear Center in Edmonton, Canada

Faith Rivera (born Esther Faith Rivera, Waimea, Hawaii County, Hawaii) is an American singer-songwriter. Rivera set up the independent record label and publishing company Lil' Girl Creations in 1996.

Rivera performed in The Real Love: A New Musical in 2011.

She is a peace ambassador for Fine & Performing Artists for World Peace and was named the 2008 Biggest Giver for Humanity Unites Brilliance, which provided food, water, education and micro-loans to women and children. Rivera received the 2012 Grace Note Award for her contribution to the New Thought movement.

== Awards ==
Year	Nominee / work	Award	Result
2002	"Kumbaya"	Dance Song of the Year - Just Plain Folks	Won
2006	"Suncatcher" (album)	New Age Album of the Year - Just Plain Folks	Won

== Albums ==
Year	Album	Label
1997	In Search of Faith	Lil' Girl Creations
2001	Faithgroove	Lil' Girl Creations
2003	Wonder	Lil' Girl Creations
2005	Suncatcher **JPF New Age album of the year	Lil' Girl Creations
2007	Maluhia ~ Everyday Peace	Lil' Girl Creations
2008	Raise Me Up	Lil' Girl Creations
2011	Let It Out	Lil' Girl Creations
2011	The World is Waiting for You (Book & CD)	Lil' Girl Creations
2012	Where I Live There Are Rainbows	Lil' Girl Creations
2012	The Power of You and Me Songbook	Lil' Girl Creations
2016	Heart Flash Drive	Lil' Girl Creations
2020	Rise	Lil' Girl Creations
