= David Andriole =

American actor

- Born: March 16, 1964; Omaha, Nebraska U.S.
- Occupation: Actor
- Years active: 1980–present

David Mark Andriole (born March 16, 1964) is an American actor. He had a recurring role as Officer Spencer in NBC's soap opera Sunset Beach.
