= Albert Zuckerman =

American literary agent (1931–2026)

Albert Jack Zuckerman (September 8, 1931 – March 5, 2026) was an American literary agent. He was the founder of Writers House, a major literary agency in the publishing industry. Zuckerman died on March 5, 2026, at the age of 94.
