= The Point Men (2001 film) =

2001 film by John Glen

- Original theatrical poster
- Directed by: John Glen
- Written by: Steven Hartov; Ripley Highsmith
- Produced by: Silvio Muraglia; Avi Nesher; Tom Reeve
- Starring: Christopher Lambert; Kerry Fox; Vincent Regan; Cal MacAninch; Donald Sumpter; Maryam d'Abo
- Cinematography: Alec Mills
- Edited by: Matthew Glen
- Music by: Gast Waltzing
- Distributed by: Columbia TriStar Home Entertainment
- Release dates: June 15, 2001 (North America); November 2001 (United Kingdom)
- Running time: 90 minutes
- Countries: United Kingdom, France, Luxembourg
- Language: English
- Budget: $6,100,000 (estimated)

The Point Men is a 2001 spy thriller film directed by John Glen in his final film before his retirement. The film stars Christopher Lambert with supporting roles from Kerry Fox, Vincent Regan, Cal MacAninch, Donald Sumpter and Maryam d'Abo (who had earlier been in the James Bond film The Living Daylights for Glen).

== Plot ==
Tony Eckhardt is shot in an anti-terrorist operation and insists that the man killed during the operation was not their intended target, the terrorist Amar Kamil. Kamil undergoes extensive facial reconstruction surgery to look like a man kidnapped to take the fall for an assassination planned to take place during an upcoming press conference. Members of the Israeli team are being killed off and Eckhardt pursues Kamil while hoping to stay alive to raise his unborn daughter.

== Cast ==
- Christopher Lambert as Tony Eckhardt
- Kerry Fox as Maddy Hope
- Vincent Regan as Amar Kamil
- Cal Macaninch as Horst
- Nicolas de Pruyssenaere as Peter Hauser
- Donald Sumpter as Benni Baum
- Maryam d'Abo as Francie Koln
