= Black Cream =

Black Cream may refer to:

- Black Cream, a 1975 album by The Harold Wheeler Consort
- Together for Days, a 1972 film about an interracial relationship later re-released under the title Black Cream
