= Billie Frank (Rude Awakening) =

American sitcom character, created 1998

- Rude Awakening character
- First appearance: "Naked Again" (1998)
- Last appearance: "Altar Ego" (2001)
- Created by: Claudia Lonow
- Portrayed by: Sherilyn Fenn; Kelli King (as a child)

In-universe information
- Occupation: Actress
- Family: Trudy Frank (mother); Max Frank (father); Jerry Frank (brother); Tish Frank (sister-in-law)

Wilhelmina "Billie" Frank is a fictional character, played by Sherilyn Fenn on the US television sitcom, Rude Awakening, originally run by Showtime from 1998 to 2001.

One of the show's taglines describe the character of Billie as: "Rude. Bitchy. Promiscuous. And those are her good qualities."; in fact many gags of the show are based on Billie's bad attitudes. Despite this, however, she often proves to possess some good qualities, such as affection for family and friends, as well as being more significant than might at first sight seem.

== Biography ==
Billie Frank was inspired by executive producer/creator Claudia Lonow's experience. Billie is an alcoholic has-been ex-soap actress who struggles with her self-destructive habits. She became famous playing the part of Diana Gateway in the fictional daytime soap "Emerald Bluff" in the 1980s. She was born in 1965, and has a complicated relationship with her nymphomaniac mother, Trudy Franks (Lynn Redgrave), who is resistant to the idea of growing old.

At the series beginning, Billie has a DUI accident and an embarrassing interview on an Entertainment Tonight type TV show, so with the help of her friends and the support of Alcoholics Anonymous, she decides to tries to manage her temper and her addictions. The show depicts her difficult relations with her mother, the other members of AA and her neighbor, best friend, and eventual love interest, Dave Parelli (Jonathan Penner).
