= Richard Graydon =

British stuntman (1922–2014)

- Born: 12 May 1922
- Died: 22 December 2014 (aged 92)
- Occupation(s): Stunt performer, stunt coordinator, stunt double, actor
- Years active: 1952 – 1998

Richard Graydon (12 May 1922 – 22 December 2014) was a British stunt performer and stunt coordinator best known for his work in the James Bond film series.

== Early life ==
He was educated at Stowe School in Buckinghamshire and was an amateur jockey and a dancer. He was rejected for service in the RAF in World War II due to a childhood eye injury.

== Career ==
His acting, dancing and horse-riding skills were used to good effect in the 1952 film The Story of Robin Hood and His Merrie Men, and he then developed a career as a stunt performer. His stunts for James Bond films included tobogganing down the Cresta Run in On Her Majesty's Secret Service, doubling for George Lazenby, and later for Roger Moore in a cable car fight scene 1,000 ft above ground on Sugarloaf Mountain, Brazil, in Moonraker. At 173 cm (5 ft 8 in) in height, Graydon was 13 cm (5 in) shorter than Moore, but it was necessary to maintain the height difference with the stuntman doubling for the 218 cm (7 ft 2 in) Richard Kiel, who played Jaws. In the scene, he had to fall and then hold on to the roof of the cable car with his hands and did not have his safety harness on. His left hand slipped off the roof but he held on one-handed until he could regain his grip. He became known for his ability to hang onto things high above the ground and was selected for stunts that required that skill.

He married in 1970 and died in December 2014, aged 92.

== Selective stunt filmography ==
Year	Title	Role
1968	The Charge of the Light Brigade	stunt coordinator
1973	Don't Look Now	stunt coordinator
1976	The Man Who Fell to Earth	stunt coordinator
1985	Ladyhawke	stunt coordinator
1989	Batman	stunts
1998	Lock, Stock and Two Smoking Barrels	stunts

== Selective actor filmography ==
Year	Title	Role	Notes
1952	The Story of Robin Hood and His Merrie Men	Merrie Man #10	
1953	Grand National Night	Chandler	
1965	Thunderball	Largo henchman	Uncredited
1967	You Only Live Twice	Russian Cosmonaut #2	
1968	The Charge of the Light Brigade	Lord Bingham	
1969	On Her Majesty's Secret Service	Draco's Driver	Uncredited
1971	The Last Valley	Yuri	Uncredited
1974	Dead Cert	Jockey	Uncredited
1977	The Duellists	Cossack / Hussar	
1979	Love and Bullets	Antonio	
1979	Moonraker	Space Fighter	Uncredited
1980	North Sea Hijack	Rasmussen	
1981	Eye of the Needle	Home Guard Private	
1983	Octopussy	Francisco the Fearless	
1985	Déjà Vu	Captain Wilson	
1990	Wings of Fame		
1990	The Fool		
1997	Shooting Fish	Racehorse Trainer	(final film role)
