= Moonraker (film) =

1979 James Bond film by Lewis Gilbert

- Theatrical release poster by Dan Gouzee
- Directed by: Lewis Gilbert
- Screenplay by: Christopher Wood
- Based on: Moonraker; 1955 novel by Ian Fleming
- Produced by: Albert R. Broccoli
- Starring: Roger Moore; Lois Chiles; Michael Lonsdale; Richard Kiel; Corinne Cléry
- Cinematography: Jean Tournier
- Edited by: John Glen
- Music by: John Barry
- Production companies: Eon Productions; Les Productions Artistes Associés
- Distributed by: United Artists
- Release dates: 26 June 1979 (United Kingdom); 29 June 1979 (United States); 10 October 1979 (France)
- Running time: 126 minutes
- Countries: United Kingdom; United States; France
- Language: English
- Budget: $34 million
- Box office: $210.3 million

Moonraker is a 1979 spy-fi film, the eleventh in the James Bond series produced by Eon Productions, and the fourth to star Roger Moore as the fictional MI6 agent James Bond. The third and final film in the series to be directed by Lewis Gilbert, it co-stars Lois Chiles, Michael Lonsdale, Corinne Cléry and Richard Kiel. In the film, Bond investigates the vanishing of a Space Shuttle orbiter, leading him to Hugo Drax, the owner of the shuttle's manufacturing firm. Along with astronaut Dr. Holly Goodhead, Bond follows the mystery from California to Venice, Rio de Janeiro, the Amazon rainforest, and finally into outer space to prevent a plot to wipe out the world population and repopulate humanity with a master race.

The story was intended by author Ian Fleming to become a film even before he completed the novel in 1954; he based it on a screenplay manuscript he had devised earlier. The producers had originally intended to make For Your Eyes Only, but chose Moonraker as a result of the resurgence of the science fiction genre, following the success of Star Wars, and NASA's concurrent test flights of the Space Shuttle. Due to budget problems, it was shot primarily in France; other locations included Italy, Brazil, Guatemala and the United States. The soundstages of Pinewood Studios in England, traditionally used for the series, were only used by the special effects team.

Moonraker had a high production cost of $34 million, more than twice as much as The Spy Who Loved Me (1977), and it received mixed reviews. However, the film's visuals were praised, with Derek Meddings being nominated for the Academy Award for Best Visual Effects, and it eventually became the highest-grossing film of the series at the time with $210.3 million worldwide, a record that stood until 1995's GoldenEye.

The next film in the series, For Your Eyes Only, was released in 1981.

== Plot ==
A Drax Industries Moonraker Space Shuttle orbiter on loan to the United Kingdom is hijacked in midair while aboard a Shuttle Carrier Aircraft. The carrier is destroyed, but no wreckage of the shuttle is found. M, head of MI6, assigns James Bond, Agent 007, to investigate. En route to England, Bond is attacked and thrown from a plane by assassin Jaws. He survives by stealing the pilot's parachute, while Jaws lands on a trapeze net inside a circus tent.

At the Drax Industries spaceplane-manufacturing complex in California, Bond meets company owner Hugo Drax and his henchman Chang. He also meets Dr Holly Goodhead, an astronaut, and survives an assassination attempt inside a centrifuge chamber. Drax's personal pilot, Corinne Dufour, helps Bond find blueprints for a glass vial made in Venice. After discovering her betrayal, Drax has her pursued and killed by his Beauceron hounds.

In Venice, Bond encounters Goodhead and sees her sneaking around a door near the glass factory. Drax's henchmen pursue him through the canals, but he later returns to the factory and discovers a secret biological laboratory. He learns that the glass vials are designed to contain a nerve gas deadly to humans but harmless to plants and animals. He is attacked by Chang but throws him through the stained glass clockface of the Saint Mark's clocktower, killing him. During the fight, Bond finds evidence that Drax is moving his operation to Rio de Janeiro. He rejoins Goodhead and sleeps with her after revealing that he has deduced she is a CIA agent spying on Drax. Bond has preserved one of the vials as evidence after the laboratory disappears; he gives it to M for analysis, and M permits him to travel to Rio de Janeiro under the pretence of being on leave.

Bond survives attacks by Jaws, now serving as Chang's replacement, during Rio Carnival and on the Sugarloaf Cable Car at Sugarloaf Mountain. After the cable car crashes, Jaws is rescued from the wreckage by Dolly, a young woman, and they fall in love. Drax's forces capture Goodhead, but Bond escapes and learns that the toxin is derived from a rare orchid native to the Amazon jungle. Travelling along the Amazon River, he comes under attack from Drax's forces before locating his base. He is captured by Jaws and taken to Drax, where he witnesses four Moonraker shuttles launch. Drax explains that he stole the loaned shuttle because another in his fleet had developed a fault during assembly. Bond and Goodhead are imprisoned beneath the launch platform and narrowly escape being incinerated by the exhaust of Moonraker 5, which carries Drax. They then pose as the pilots of Moonraker 6. The shuttles dock with Drax's space station, which is hidden from radar by a cloaking device.

Bond and Goodhead disable the radar-jamming cloaking device, allowing the United States military to send a company of space marines aboard another shuttle to intercept the now-visible station. Jaws captures them, and Drax reveals his plan to destroy humanity by launching fifty globes that will disperse the nerve gas throughout Earth's atmosphere. He has transported several dozen genetically perfect young men and women of varying races to the station, where they will remain until Earth is safe for human life. Their descendants will then become a "new master race." Bond persuades Jaws to turn against Drax by getting him to admit that anyone failing to meet his physical standards, including Jaws and Dolly, will be exterminated. Jaws attacks Drax's guards, and a laser battle follows between Drax's forces and Bond, Jaws, and the Marines. Drax's forces are defeated and the station destroyed; Bond shoots and ejects Drax into space. He and Goodhead use the laser-equipped Moonraker 5 to destroy the three launched globes before returning to Earth. Jaws and Dolly, having ejected themselves in one of Drax's escape pods, are recovered by the Marines. Bond's superiors receive a video feed from Moonraker 5 and are shocked to see him and Goodhead having sex in zero gravity.

== Cast ==
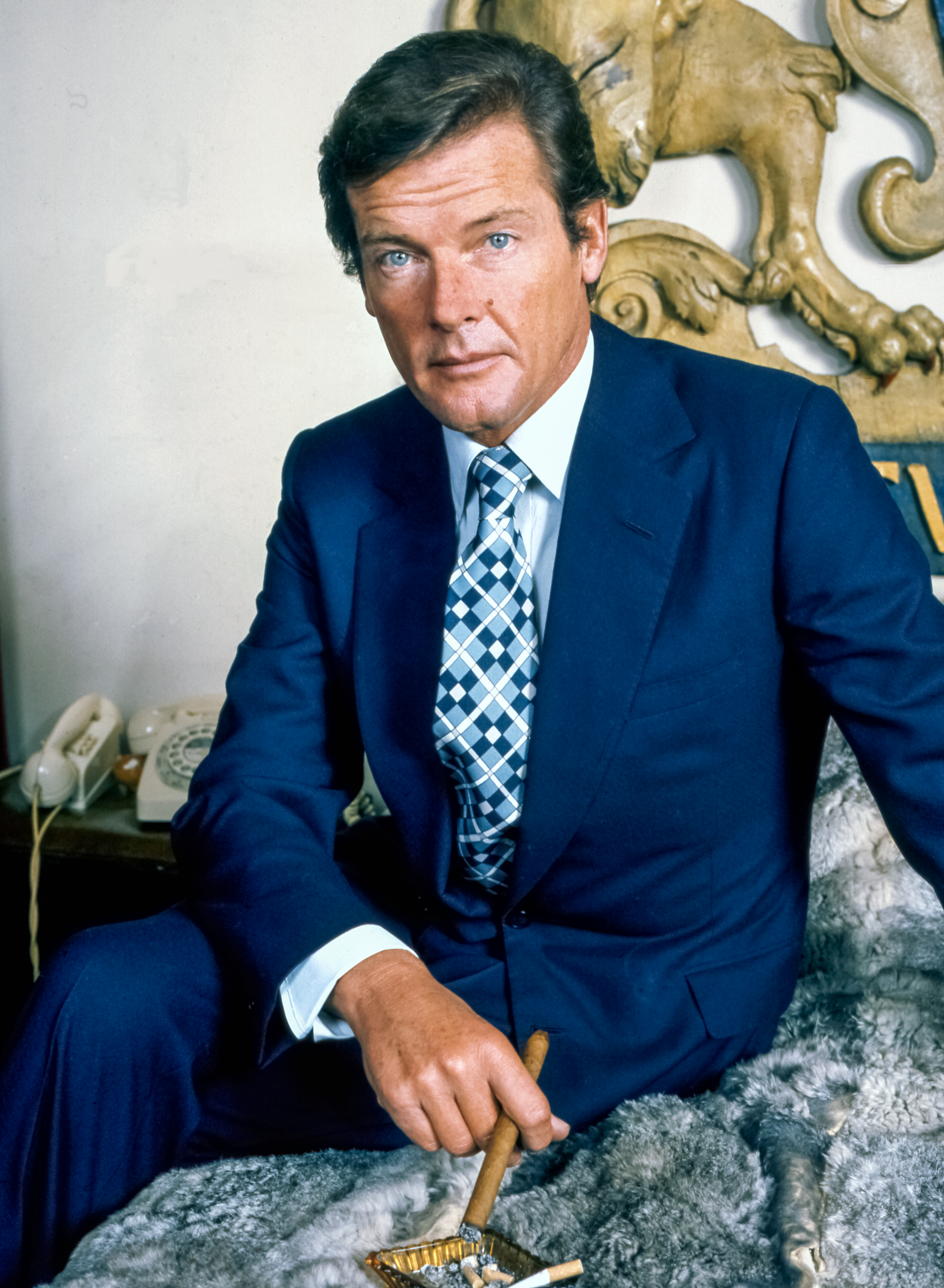
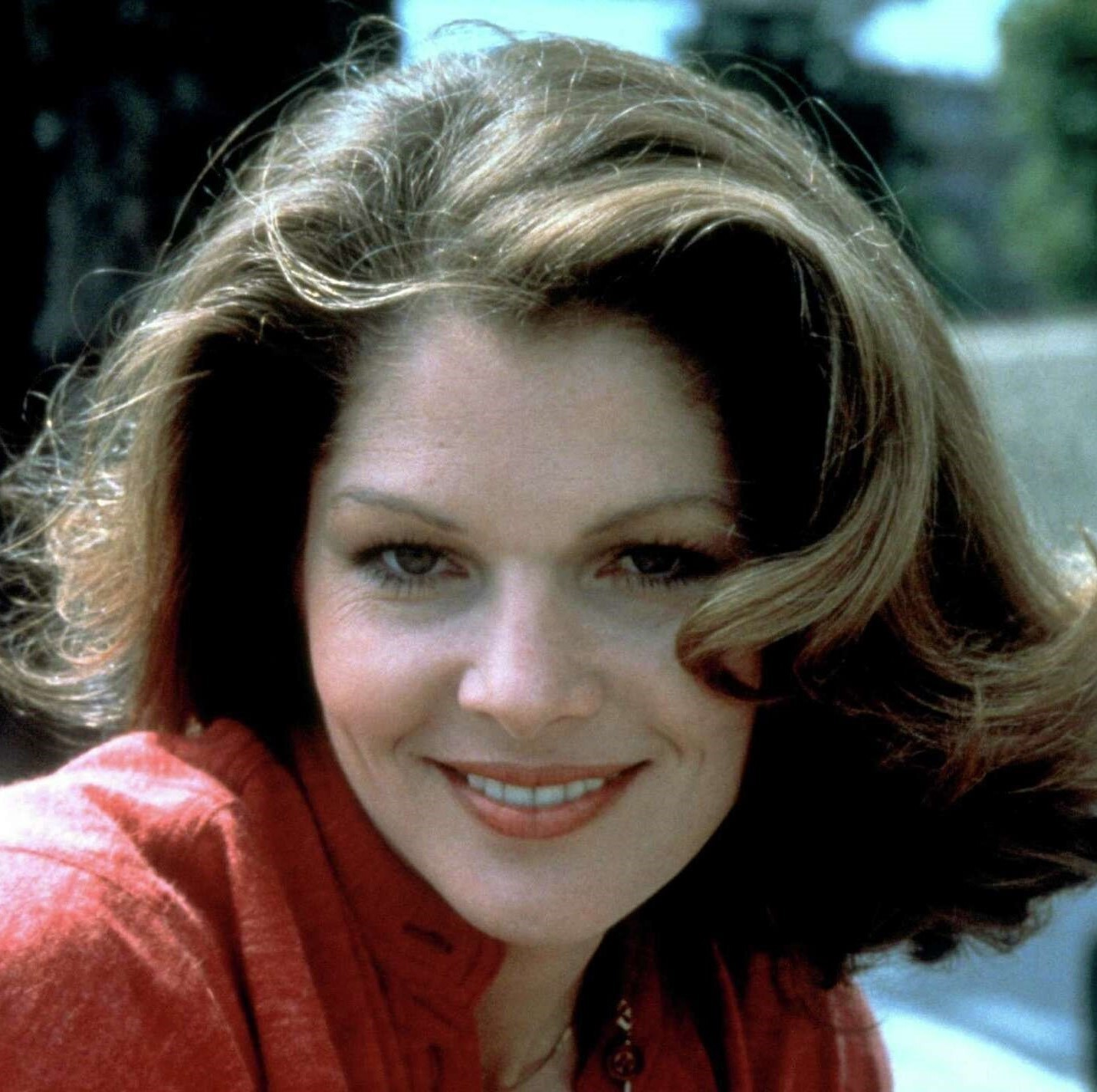
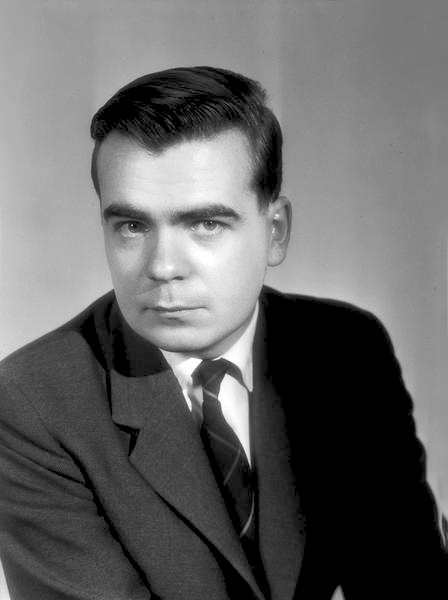
Roger Moore (left) in 1973, Lois Chiles (middle) in 1979 and Michael Lonsdale in 1960
- Roger Moore as Commander James Bond "007", an MI6 agent assigned to look into the theft of a shuttle from the "Moonraker" space programme.
- Lois Chiles as Holly Goodhead, an astronaut scientist on loan from NASA working at Drax Industries. She is later revealed to be a CIA agent.
- Michael Lonsdale as Hugo Drax, an industrialist who plans to poison all humans on Earth, then repopulate the planet from his space station.
- Richard Kiel as Jaws, Drax's new henchman who replaces Chang at Drax Industries. He is known for his giant stature and possessing a set of strong steel teeth.
- Corinne Cléry as Corinne Dufour, Drax's personal pilot.
- Emily Bolton as Manuela, 007's contact in Rio.
- Toshiro Suga as Chang, Drax's first henchman.
- Irka Bochenko as Blonde Beauty, Drax's lead henchwoman.
- Geoffrey Keen as Frederick Gray
- Lois Maxwell as Miss Moneypenny, M's secretary.
- Bernard Lee as "M", the head of MI6. This was Lee's final appearance as M before his death in January 1981.
- Desmond Llewelyn as "Q", MI6's quartermaster who supplies Bond with multipurpose vehicles and gadgets useful for the latter's mission.
- Anne Lonnberg as a museum guide, and Drax's henchwoman.
- Jean-Pierre Castaldi as the pilot of the private jet from the opening sequence.
- Blanche Ravalec as Dolly, Jaws' girlfriend; her name is not given in dialogue but she is named in the closing credits.
- Michael Marshall as Colonel Scott, an American Space Marines commander.
- Leila Shenna as the hostess of the private jet from the opening sequence.

== Production ==
The end credits for the previous Bond film, The Spy Who Loved Me, said, "James Bond will return in For Your Eyes Only". However, following an increase in the popularity of science fiction such as 1977 space opera film Star Wars, the producers chose the novel Moonraker as the basis for the next film. For Your Eyes Only was postponed and ended up following Moonraker in 1981. It was intended to be released alongside the test launches of the Space Shuttle.

=== Script ===
Ian Fleming had originally intended the novel, published in 1955, to be made into a film even before he began writing it. A part of the novel was thus based on an original idea for a screenplay which had been on his mind for years. Fleming first pitched the novel to Hungarian-British film producer Alexander Korda, who had expressed interest in purchasing the rights to Live and Let Die. In 1954, Stanley Meyer attempted to purchase an option for both Live and Let Die and Moonraker, but withdrew his offer after Fleming asked for too much money. In 1955, American actor John Payne offered $1,000 for a nine-month option to Moonraker, plus $10,000 if production eventually took off. The negotiations broke up the following year because of disagreements regarding Payne's ownership of the other Bond novels caused when Fleming tried to manipulate Payne and the Rank Organisation into getting in a bidding war with each other. Fleming eventually settled with Rank Organisation, a British company who owned Pinewood Studios. Rank wound up not developing the film, even after Fleming contributed his own script trying to push production forward, and Fleming purchased the rights back in 1959.

However, as with several previous Bond films, the story from Fleming's novel is almost entirely dispensed with, and little more than the idea of Hugo Drax as an industrialist who makes rockets was used. Drax has a plan for a master race in the film, but in the novel actually had been a Nazi (unbeknownst to the British). The dramatic scene of Bond and his female companion being trapped in an exhaust duct under a rocket where they are nearly burned to death also appears. Otherwise the film is more in keeping with contemporary trends in science fiction. The 2002 Bond film Die Another Day makes further use of some ideas and character names from the novel. Tom Mankiewicz wrote a short outline for Moonraker that was mostly discarded. According to Mankiewicz, footage shot at Drax's lairs was considerably more detailed than the edited result in the final version. Some scenes from Mankiewicz's script were used in subsequent films, including the Acrostar Jet sequence, used in the pre-credit sequence for Octopussy, and the Eiffel Tower scene in A View to a Kill.

In 1978 Steven Spielberg offered to direct after the release of Close Encounters of the Third Kind, but Albert R. Broccoli turned him down. In March 2004 rumours surfaced about a lost 1956 version of Moonraker by Orson Welles, and a James Bond web site repeated it on April Fool's Day in 2004 as a hoax. Supposedly, this recently discovered lost film consisted of 40 minutes of raw footage with Dirk Bogarde as Bond, Welles as Drax, and Peter Lorre as Drax's henchman.

==== Novelisation ====
The screenplay of Moonraker differed so much from Ian Fleming's novel that Eon Productions authorised the screenwriter Christopher Wood to write a novelisation, his second (after James Bond, the Spy Who Loved Me). It was named James Bond and Moonraker to avoid confusion with Fleming's original novel Moonraker. It was published in 1979, with the film's release.

=== Casting ===
Roger Moore had originally signed a three-film contract with Eon Productions, which covered his first three appearances: Live and Let Die in 1973, The Man with the Golden Gun in 1974 and The Spy Who Loved Me in 1977. From Moonraker onwards, Moore was contracted on a film-by-film basis.

Initially, the chief villain, Hugo Drax, was to be played by British actor James Mason, but once the decision was made that the film would be an Anglo-French co-production under the 1965–1979 film treaty, French actor Michael Lonsdale was cast as Drax and Corinne Cléry was chosen for the part of Corinne Dufour, to comply with qualifying criteria of the agreement. Stewart Granger and Louis Jourdan were considered also for the role of Drax. Jourdan later portrayed prince Kamal Khan, chief villain of Octopussy.

American actress Lois Chiles had originally been offered the role of Anya Amasova in The Spy Who Loved Me (1977), but had turned down the part when she decided to take temporary retirement. Chiles was cast as Holly Goodhead by chance, when she was given the seat next to Lewis Gilbert on a flight and he believed she would be ideal for the role as the CIA scientist. Jaclyn Smith was originally offered the role of Holly Goodhead but had to turn it down owing to scheduling conflicts with Charlie's Angels.

Drax's henchman Chang was played by Japanese aikido instructor Toshiro Suga; he was recommended for the role by executive producer Michael G. Wilson, who was one of his pupils. Wilson, continuing a tradition he started in the film Goldfinger, has a small cameo role in Moonraker: he appears twice, first as a tourist outside the Venini Glass shop and museum in Venice, then at the end of the film as a technician in the US Navy control room.

The Jaws character, played by Richard Kiel, makes a return, although in Moonraker the role is played more for comedic effect than in The Spy Who Loved Me. Jaws was intended to be a villain against Bond, but director Lewis Gilbert stated on the DVD documentary that he received so much fan mail from small children saying, "Why can't Jaws be a goodie not a baddie", that as a result he was persuaded to gradually transform Jaws into Bond's ally by the end of the film.

Originally Jaws's girlfriend was going to be portrayed as even taller than him, but Kiel insisted on a rewrite. Diminutive French actress Blanche Ravalec, who had recently begun her career with minor roles in French films such as Michel Lang's Holiday Hotel (1978) and Claude Sautet's A Simple Story (1978), was cast as the bespectacled Dolly, the girlfriend of Jaws. Originally, the producers were dubious about whether the audience would accept the height difference between them, and only made their decision once they were informed by Richard Kiel that his own wife was of the same height. Lois Maxwell's 22-year-old daughter, Melinda Maxwell, was also cast as one of the "perfect" human specimens from Drax's master race.

=== Filming ===
Production began on 14 August 1978. The main shooting was switched from the usual 007 Stage at the Pinewood Studios to Épinay and Billancourt Studios in France, because of the high taxation in Britain at the time. Only the cable car interiors and space battle exteriors were filmed at Pinewood. The massive sets designed by Ken Adam were the largest ever constructed in France and required more than 222,000 man-hours to construct (roughly 1,000 hours by each of the crew, on average).

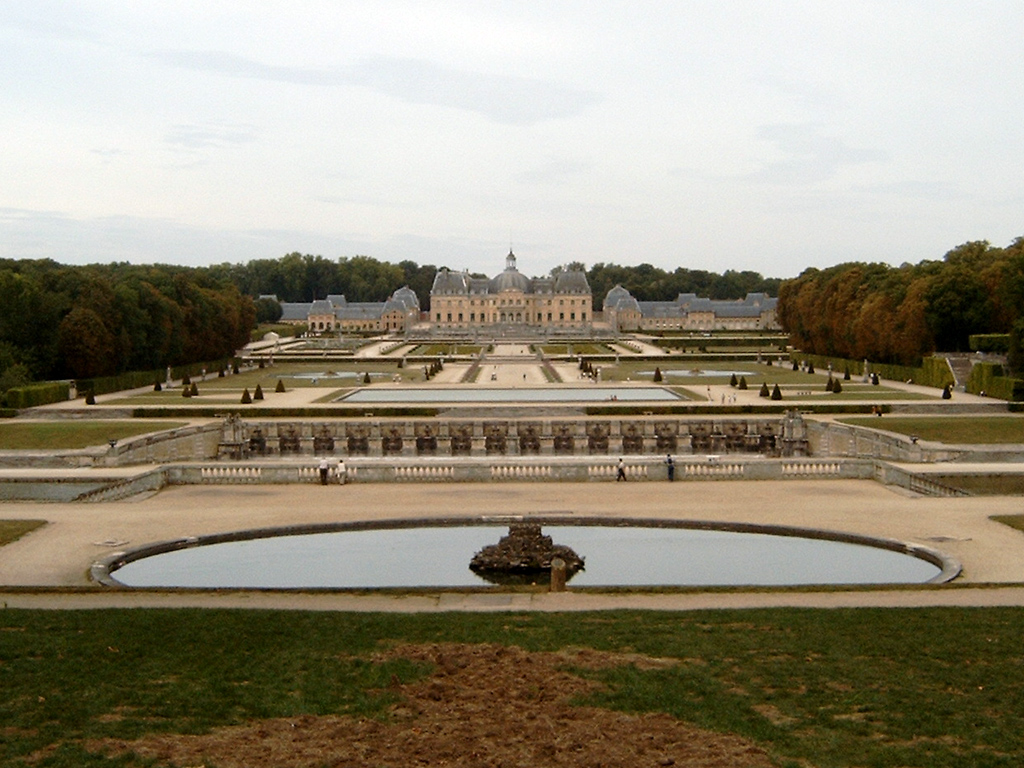
The Château de Vaux-le-Vicomte was used for Drax's chateau in the film. An extensive aerial view of the site was witnessed by helicopter in the early stages of the film by Bond and Dufour arriving.

Drax's mansion, set in California, was actually filmed at the Château de Vaux-le-Vicomte, about 55 kilometres (34 mi) southeast of Paris, for the exteriors and Grand Salon. The remaining interiors, including some of the scenes with Corinne Defour and the drawing room, were filmed at the Château de Guermantes.

Much of the film was shot in the cities of London, Paris, Venice, Palmdale, California, Port St. Lucie, Florida, and Rio de Janeiro. The production team had considered India and Nepal as locations, but after scouting trips these were rejected as impractical to work into the script, particularly considering the time constraints. They decided on Rio de Janeiro relatively early on, a city that producer Albert R. Broccoli had visited on holiday, and a team was sent there in early 1978 to capture initial footage from the Carnival, which featured in the film.

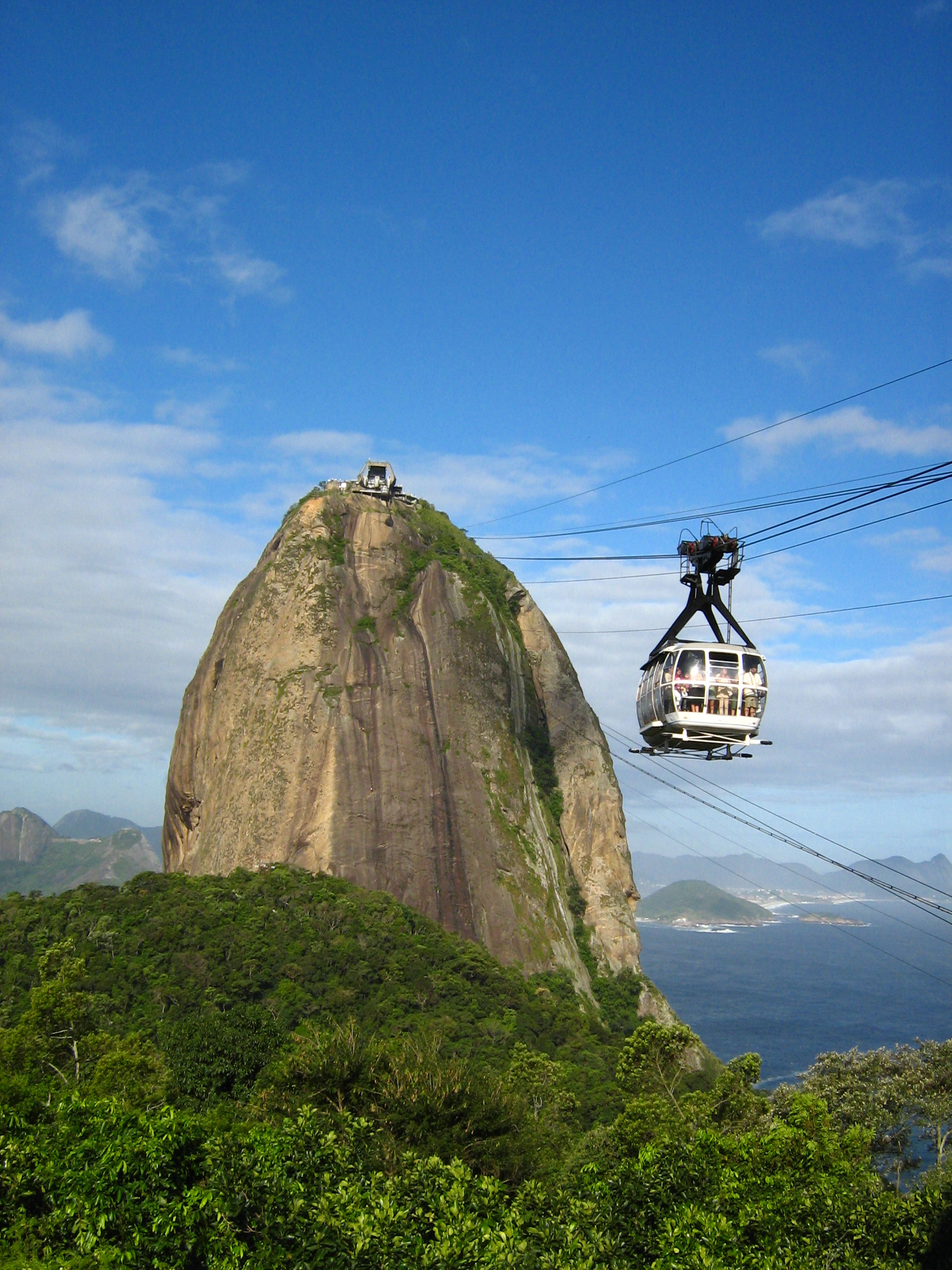
Stuntman Richard Graydon slipped and narrowly avoided falling to his death during the filming of the cable car sequence at Sugarloaf Mountain.

At the Rio de Janeiro location, many months later, Roger Moore arrived several days later than scheduled for shooting, owing to recurrent health problems and an attack of kidney stones that he had suffered while in France, Moore previously suffered this while filming Live and Let Die in 1973. Upon arrival, Moore was immediately taken from the plane for hair and make-up work before reboarding to film the sequence with him arriving as James Bond. Sugarloaf Mountain was a prominent location, and during filming of the midair cable car sequence in which Bond and Goodhead are attacked by Jaws, stuntman Richard Graydon slipped and narrowly avoided falling to his death. For the scene in which Jaws bites into the steel cable-car cable with his teeth, the cable was actually made of liquorice, although Kiel was still required to use his steel dentures.

The Iguaçu Falls, in the south of Brazil, was used in the film, although as Q notes, the falls were supposedly somewhere in the upper basin of the River Amazon. The second unit had originally planned on sending an actual boat over the falls. However, on attempting to release it, the boat became firmly embedded on rocks near the edge. Despite a dangerous attempt by helicopter and rope ladder to retrieve it, the plan had to be abandoned, forcing the second unit to use a miniature at Pinewood instead. The exterior of Drax's pyramid headquarters in the Amazon rain forest near the falls was actually filmed at the Tikal Mayan ruins in Guatemala. The interior of the pyramid, however, was designed by Ken Adam at a French studio, in which he deliberately used a shiny coating to make the walls look plastic and false. All of the space centre scenes were shot at the Vehicle Assembly Building of the Kennedy Space Center, Florida, although some of the earlier scenes of the Moonraker assembly plant had been filmed on location at the Rockwell International manufacturing plant in Palmdale, California.

The climax with the laser battle on Drax's space station. Moonraker holds the world record for the largest number of zero gravity wires in one scene.

The early scene in which Jaws pushes Bond out of the aircraft without a parachute took weeks of planning and preparation. The skydiving sequence was coordinated by Don Calvedt under the supervision of second unit director John Glen and was shot above Lake Berryessa in northern California. As Calvedt and skydiving champion B.J. Worth developed the equipment for the scene, which included a 1-inch-thick (25 mm) parachute pack that could be concealed beneath the suit to give the impression of the missing parachute, and equipment to prevent the freefalling cameraman from suffering whiplash while opening his parachute, they brought in stuntman Jake Lombard to test it all. Lombard eventually played Bond in the scene, with Worth as the pilot from whom Bond takes a parachute, and Ron Luginbill as Jaws. Both Lombard and Worth became regular members of the stunt team for aerial sequences in later Bond films. When the stuntmen opened their parachutes at the end of every shoot, custom-sewn velcro costume seams separated to allow the hidden parachutes to open. The skydiver cinematographer used a lightweight Panavision experimental plastic anamorphic lens, bought from an old pawn shop in Paris, which he had adapted, and attached to his helmet to shoot the entire sequence. The scene took a total of 88 skydives by the stuntmen to be completed. The only scenes shot in studio were close-ups of Roger Moore and Richard Kiel.

Since NASA's Space Shuttle program had not been launched, Derek Meddings and his miniatures team had to create the rocket launch footage without any reference. Shuttle models attached to bottle rockets and signal flares were used for take-off, and the smoke trail was created with salt that fell from the models. The space scenes were done by rewinding the camera after an element was shot, enabling other elements to be superimposed in the film stock, with the space battle needing up to forty rewinds to incorporate everything. The climactic scenes of the space station disintegrating were created by Meddings and other members of the special effects team shooting the miniature model with shotguns.

As James Bond is arriving at the scene of the pheasant shoot, a trumpet is sounded playing the first three brass notes from Also sprach Zarathustra, referencing the film 2001: A Space Odyssey (1968). During a scene set in Venice, a keypad is unlocked by playing the motif featured in the film Close Encounters of the Third Kind (1977).

=== Music ===
The soundtrack of Moonraker was composed by John Barry and recorded in Paris, again, as with production, marking a turning point away from the prior studio, CTS Studios in London. The score also marked a turning point in John Barry's output, abandoning the Kentonesque brass of his earlier Bond scores in favor of slow, rich string passages—a trend which Barry would continue in the 1980s with scores such as Out of Africa and Somewhere in Time. For Moonraker, for the first time since Diamonds Are Forever (1971), Barry used a piece of music called "007" (on track 7), the secondary Bond theme composed by Barry and introduced in From Russia with Love during Bond's escape with the Lektor; some classical music pieces were also included.

Moonraker was the third of three Bond films for which the theme song was performed by Shirley Bassey (following Goldfinger and Diamonds Are Forever). Frank Sinatra was originally considered for the vocals, and Kate Bush was asked, but she declined. Johnny Mathis was approached and offered the opportunity. However, Mathis—despite having started recording with Barry—was unable to complete the project, leaving producers to offer the song to Bassey just weeks before the premiere date in England. Bassey made the recordings with very short notice and as a result, she never regarded the song 'as her own' as she had never had the chance to perform it in full or promote it first. The film uses two versions of the title theme song, a ballad version heard over the main titles, and a disco version over the closing titles. The song made little impact on the charts, reaching #159, partly attributed to Bassey's failure to promote the single, given the last-minute decision to quickly record it to meet the schedule and confusion regarding the two versions of the track, when the United Artists single release labelled the tracks on the 7" single as "Moonraker (Main Title)" for the version used to close the film and "Moonraker (End Title)" for the track that opened the film.

In 2005, Bassey sang the song for the first time outside James Bond on stage as part of a medley of her three Bond title songs. An instrumental strings version of the title theme was used in 2007 tourism commercials for the Dominican Republic.

== Release and reception ==
Moonraker premiered on 26 June 1979 at the Odeon Leicester Square in London. It grossed an opening record for the cinema of £67,139 in its first week and was the number one film in London and went on to gross £10.7 million in the UK. Three days after the London opening, it went on general release in the US, opening in 788 theatres with 900 prints struck; it was United Artists' widest opening at the time. It grossed $14,744,718 in its first week from 900 bookings. On the mainland of Europe, the most common month of release was in August 1979, opening in the Nordic countries of Denmark, Finland, Norway, Iceland and Sweden between 13 and 18 August. Given that the film was produced largely in France, and it involved some notable French actors, the French premiere for the film was relatively late, released in that country on 10 October 1979. It saw a record attendance of 413,314 in its first week in France. Moonraker grossed a worldwide total of $210.3 million, making it United Artists' highest-grossing film at the time, surpassing The Spy Who Loved Me.

With Moonraker, we went too far in the outlandish. The audience did not believe any more and Roger spoofed too much.

— Richard Maibaum

Moonraker received a mixed reception by critics. On review aggregator Rotten Tomatoes, the film holds a 59% approval rating based on 56 reviews, with an average rating of 5.50/10. The site's critical consensus reads, "Featuring one of the series' more ludicrous plots but outfitted with primo gadgets and spectacular sets, Moonraker is both silly and entertaining." On Metacritic the film has a score of 66% based on reviews from 13 critics.

The New York Times film critic Vincent Canby called Moonraker "one of the most buoyant Bond films of all. Almost everyone connected with the movie is in top form, even Mr. Moore. Here he's as ageless, resourceful, and graceful as the character he inhabits." Canby subsequently said the film was, alongside Goldfinger, the best of the series.

The Globe and Mail critic Jay Scott said Moonraker was second only to Goldfinger. "In the first few minutes—before the credits—it offers more thrills than most escapist movies provide in two hours." During the title sequence, "the excitement has gone all the way up to giddy and never comes down." Scott admired the film's theme song and cited with approval the film's location work. He also singled out Ken Adam's sets, dubbing them "high-tech Piranesi".

Frank Rich of Time felt "The result is a film that is irresistibly entertaining as only truly mindless spectacle can be. Those who have held out on Bond movies over 17 years may not be convinced by Moonraker, but everyone else will be."

Reviewers such as James Berardinelli praised the visual effects and stunts, and film scholar James Monaco designated the film a "minor masterpiece" and declared it the best Bond film of them all.

However, other critics consider Moonraker one of the lesser films in the series, largely because of the extent and absurdity of the plot which takes James Bond into space, some of the ploys used in the film for comedic effect, and its extended dialogue. In November 2006, Entertainment Weekly ranked Moonraker fourteenth among the Bond films, describing it as "by far the campiest of all 007 movies" with "one of the worst theme songs." IGN listed it eleventh, calling it outlandish and saying that despite the actors "trying what they can to ground the film in reality, the laser gun/space station finale pretty much undercuts their efforts." Norman Wilner of MSN chose it as the fourth-worst film of the series, considering that the film "just flat-out sucks."

Critic Nicholas Sylvain said "Moonraker seems to have more than its share of little flaws and annoyances which begin right from the opening pre-credit sequence. The sheer idiocy (and impossibility) of having a fully fueled shuttle on the back of the Boeing during the trans-Atlantic crossing should be evident, and later in the film, the whole Jaws-falls-in-love and becomes a 'good guy' routine leaves me rather cold, and provides far too much cheesy comedy moments, as does the gondola driving through the square scene."

The scene in which Moore drives a hovercraft gondola around St Mark's Square in Venice was widely criticised by film critics.

In a review of the film from 1979, Gene Siskel of the Chicago Tribune took a critical view of its amount of product placement, and observed:

In the beginning of the Bond series, before they were thought of as a series, each film was a good action picture with a colourful, entertaining hero.

Today, they come off as conglomerate business enterprises rather than movies. How else does one explain the intrusive commercial plugs in "Moonraker" for Christian Dior perfume, British Airways, Bollinger champagne, Glastron boats, and Seiko watches? Truly, money derived from these plugs can't be worth the loss of story continuity when the products are flashed in front of the camera. Someone is being awfully cheap about the plugs, which borders on incredibility because the James Bond series is one of the surest moneymakers in the film business. Maybe the producers of "Moonraker" are blind to story construction?

That certainly would explain the film's failure.

In a review of the film from the same year, the Chicago Sun-Times film critic Roger Ebert, while clearly expressing his approval of the advanced special effects and Ken Adam's extravagant production sets, criticised the pace in which the locations of the film evolved, remarking, "it's so jammed with faraway places and science fiction special effects that Bond has to move at a trot just to make it into all the scenes." Christopher Null of Filmcritic.com said of the film: "Most rational observers agree that Moonraker is without a doubt the most absurd James Bond movie, definitely of the Roger Moore era and possibly of all time." However, while he criticised the extravagance of the plot and action sequences, he believed that this added to the enjoyment of the film, and particularly approved of the remark "I think he's attempting re-entry!" by "Q" during Bond and Goodhead's orbiting of the Earth which he described as "featuring what might be the best double entendre ever."

Reviewing Moonraker, film critic Danny Peary wrote, "The worst James Bond film to date has Roger Moore walking through the paces for his hefty paycheck and giving way to his double for a series of unimaginative action scenes and 'humorous' chases. There's little suspense and the humor falls flat. Not only is Jaws so pacified by love that he becomes a good guy, but the filmmakers also have the gall to set the finale in outer space and stage a battle right out of Star Wars."

The exaggerated nature of the plot and space station sequence has seen the film parodied on numerous occasions. Of note is the Austin Powers spoof film The Spy Who Shagged Me (1999) which, while a parody of other James Bond films, makes reference to Moonraker by Dr. Evil's lair in space. The scene in which Drax is shot by the cyanide dart and ousted into space is parodied by Powers' ejection of Dr. Evil's clone Mini-Me into outer space in the same way.

Sean Connery, who had played James Bond in six of the first seven films in the series, said in an interview: "I went in London to see Moonraker with Roger and I think it's departed so much from any sort of credence from the reality that we had [in my six films]." He also criticised the film for having "such a dependence on the [special] effects" and said that it had "no substance".

Jim Smith and Stephen Lavington, in their 2002 retrospective Bond Films, thought the movie shared too many similarities with its predecessor (The Spy Who Loved Me), and faulted Bond's "patronising" attitude towards women and Holly Goodhead's ineptitude. They summarise Moonraker as "ghastly, painful viewing."

However, the opening skydiving sequence, in which Bond is pushed out of an aeroplane by Jaws, and must obtain a parachute from the pilot skydiving below him, has come to be considered one of the series best pre-title sequences. It is frequently lauded by critics and fans as one of the most spectacular action sequences in the Bond series.

=== Television ===
Moonraker had its US television premiere on the ABC Sunday Night Movie on 22 November 1981, during the same month ABC also featured the Sunday night television premieres of Grease and Close Encounters of the Third Kind. Moonraker finished first in its 9–11 p.m. Sunday nighttime period—and fifth overall for the full week—with a Nielsen Media Research household rating of 24.2, a 39% share of audience, and nearly 40 million people watching. It was the Bond franchise's highest rating since 1978 on ABC, and would be the highest rating for a James Bond movie on ABC for the entire length of the 1980s.

=== Accolades ===
Derek Meddings, Paul Wilson and John Evans were nominated for the Academy Award for Best Visual Effects, and the film was nominated for three Saturn Awards, Best Science Fiction Film, Best Special Effects, and Best Supporting Actor (Richard Kiel).

== See also ==
- List of films featuring space stations
- Outline of James Bond

== Sources ==
- Block, Alex Ben; Wilson, Lucy Autrey (2010). George Lucas's Blockbusting: A Decade-by-Decade Survey of Timeless Movies Including Untold Secrets of Their Financial and Cultural Success. London: HarperCollins. ISBN 978-0-06-177889-6.
