= Diary of a Hitman =

- Directed by: Roy London
- Written by: Kenneth Pressman
- Produced by: Amin Q. Chaudhri; Karen Montgomery
- Starring: Forest Whitaker; John Bedford Lloyd; James Belushi; Lois Chiles; Sharon Stone; Sherilyn Fenn
- Cinematography: Yuri Sokol
- Edited by: Brian Smedley-Aston
- Music by: Michel Colombier
- Distributed by: Vision International
- Release dates: 1991 (Deauville Film Festival); May 29, 1992 (USA)
- Running time: 90 minutes
- Country: United States
- Language: English
- Budget: $2.5 million
- Box office: $31,815

Diary of a Hitman is a 1991 American crime drama film directed by Roy London and written by Kenneth Pressman, based on his play Insider's Price. The film stars Forest Whitaker, Sherilyn Fenn, James Belushi, Sharon Stone, and Lois Chiles. While not a hit during its original release, it has since acquired a cult fandom.

== Cast ==
- Forest Whitaker as Dekker
- John Bedford Lloyd as Dr. Jameson
- Seymour Cassel as Koenig
- James Belushi as Shandy
- Lois Chiles as Sheila
- Sharon Stone as Kiki
- Sherilyn Fenn as Jain
- Jimmy Butler as Eddie

== Production ==
Roy London was Fenn and Stone's acting coach.

== Release ==
The film premiered at the 1991 Deauville American Film Festival (August 30 to September 9, 1991), where it was nominated for the Critics' Prize.
