= Sherilyn Fenn =

American actress (born 1965)

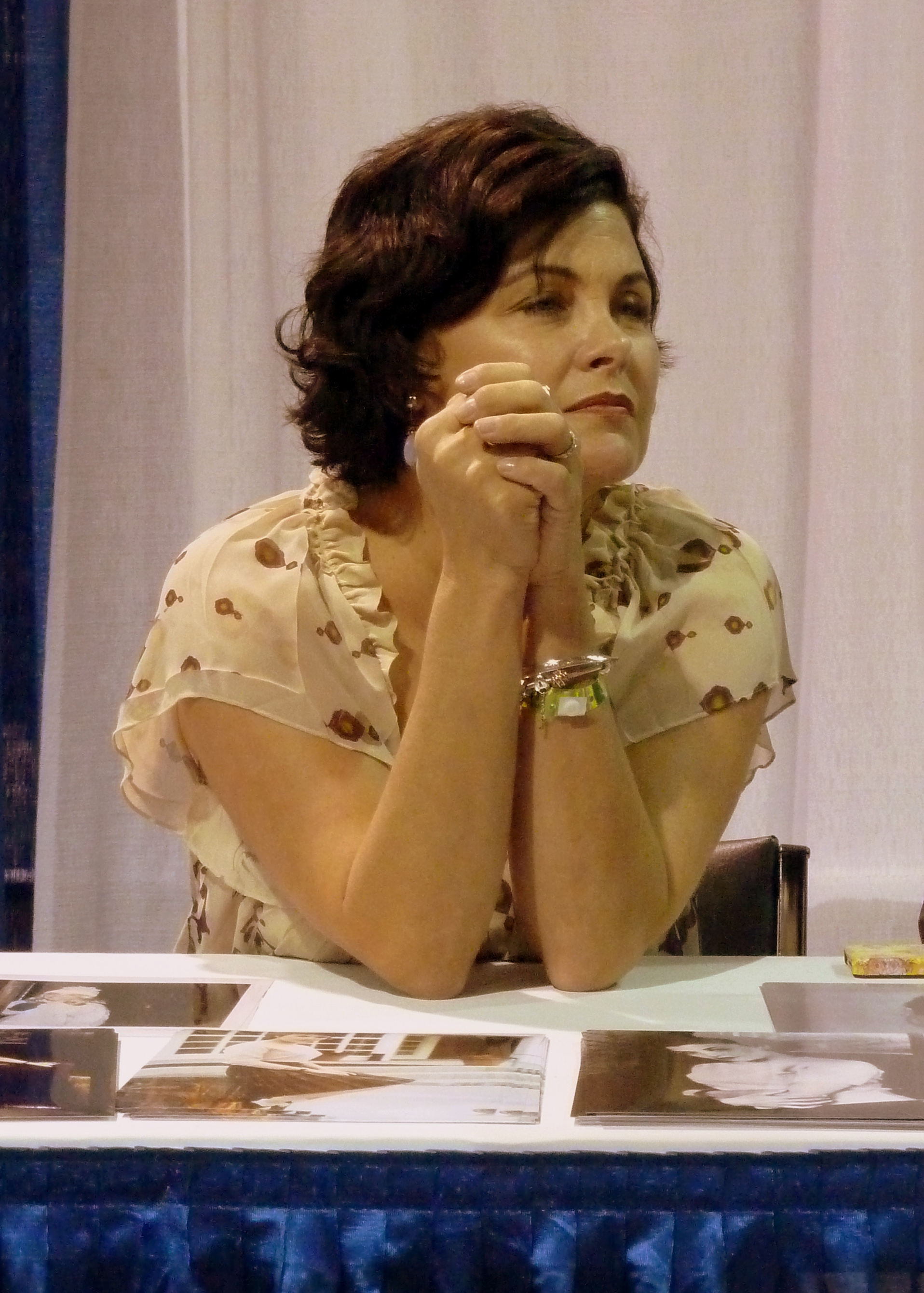
- Fenn in 2012
- Born: Sheryl Ann Fenn; February 1, 1965 (age 61); Detroit, Michigan, U.S.
- Occupation: Actress
- Years active: 1984–present
- Known for: Twin Peaks
- Spouse: Toulouse Holliday (m. 1994; div. 1997)
- Partner(s): Johnny Depp (1985–1988); Dylan Stewart (2006–2013)
- Children: 2

Sherilyn Fenn (born Sheryl Ann Fenn; February 1, 1965) is an American actress. She played Audrey Horne on the television series Twin Peaks (1990–1991, 2017) for which she was nominated for a Golden Globe Award and an Emmy Award.

She also had film roles in Two Moon Junction (1988), Wild at Heart (1990), Of Mice and Men (1992), Boxing Helena (1993) and The United States of Leland (2003) and appeared in the television series Rude Awakening (1998–2001), Shameless (2016), and Shining Vale (2022).

== Early life ==
Fenn was born Sheryl Ann Fenn on February 1, 1965, in Detroit, Michigan. She comes from a family of musicians: her mother is keyboard player Arlene Quatro, her aunt is singer Suzi Quatro, and her grandfather, Art Quatro, was a jazz musician. Her father, Leo Fenn, managed rock bands including Suzi Quatro's The Pleasure Seekers, Alice Cooper, and The Billion Dollar Babies. Fenn is of Italian and Hungarian descent on her mother's side, and Irish and French descent on her father's. She was raised Catholic.

Fenn frequently traveled with her mother and two older brothers before the family settled in Los Angeles when she was 17. Not wanting to start with a new school again, Fenn dropped out after her junior year and decided to pursue acting, enrolling at the Lee Strasberg Theatre Institute.

== Acting career ==
=== Early career (1984–1989) ===
Fenn began her career with a number of B-movies, including the 1986 skater film Thrashin' (opposite Josh Brolin and Pamela Gidley), the 1986 teen car action and revenge fantasy The Wraith (alongside Charlie Sheen and opposite Nick Cassavetes), the 1987 horror film Zombie High (alongside Virginia Madsen), and the Beauty and the Beast-inspired erotic movie Meridian. She had a part in the 1985 cult teen-comedy Just One of the Guys in which she tries to seduce a teenaged girl who was disguised as a boy, played by Joyce Hyser. Fenn starred alongside Johnny Depp in the 1985 short student film Dummies, directed by Laurie Frank for the American Film Institute. Fenn and Depp dated for three and a half years, subsequently getting engaged. In 1987, she joined Depp in a season-one episode of 21 Jump Street called "Blindsided".

Fenn has described many of these early films as sexploitation films "where directors tried to convince [her] to appear naked after the contract was signed." In a February 1993 interview she explained:

Still, I did a lot of movies instead of waitressing or that kind of thing at the beginning, and it wasn't as if I even took acting very seriously when I started. I was in California for the first time. I was going to clubs, I was going here, I was going there, I was skipping acting classes when I could. Luckily, I had an agent who really believed in me and she just kept pushing me, thinking something would happen.

Fenn landed her first starring role, as an engaged heiress to an old Southern family who falls for carnival worker Richard Tyson, in Zalman King's erotic drama film Two Moon Junction, after which she wanted to hide for a year: "I was so embarrassed about how it turned out that I went into a cocoon for a year afterwards." Two Moon Junction was meant to be Fenn's big break, but the film turned into another sexploitation film.

A lot of people said some really bad things about me for doing such a sexy movie. But I decided to do it because I wasn't comfortable with the material. I didn't want to make choices that would always put me in a place that was comfortable and secure. I thought interesting things would happen and I would grow. Interesting things did happen. I cried at the end of all my love scenes.

After these film experiences, Fenn decided to take control of her career. "I decided to be more myself and not to be pushed into what other people wanted me to be. It's scary how little imagination many people in this business have."

=== Rise to fame (1990–1991) ===
Fenn’s breakthrough came when she was cast by David Lynch and Mark Frost as the tantalizing, reckless Audrey Horne, a high school femme fatale, in the TV series Twin Peaks, which ran between 1990 and 1991. The character of Audrey was one of the most popular with fans, in particular for her unrequited love for FBI Special Agent Dale Cooper (played by Kyle MacLachlan) and her style from the 1950s (with her saddle shoes, plaid skirts, and tight sweaters). Fenn reached cult status with a scene in which she danced to Angelo Badalamenti's music and a scene in which she knotted a cherry stem in her mouth. "With Sherilyn Fenn, Twin Peaks came on and effortlessly destroyed every other show's sexuality", said James Marshall, one of her cast-mates. Speaking in September 1990, Fenn pointed out: "Audrey is a woman-child who dresses like the girls in the '50s and shows her body. But she's daddy's little girl at the same time." In the show's second season, when the idea of pairing Audrey with Cooper was abandoned, Audrey was paired with other characters like Bobby Briggs (played by Dana Ashbrook) and John Justice Wheeler (Billy Zane). About Audrey, Fenn said:

Audrey's been great for me. She has brought out a side of me that's more mischievous and fun that I had suppressed, trying to be an adult. She has made it OK to use the power one has as a woman to be manipulative at times, to be precocious. She goes after what she wants vehemently and she takes it. I think that's really admirable. I love that about her.

Shortly after shooting the Twin Peaks pilot episode, David Lynch gave her a small part in Wild at Heart, as a girl injured in a car wreck, obsessed by the contents of her purse, alongside Nicolas Cage and Laura Dern. The film won the Golden Palm Award at the 1990 Cannes Film Festival. "David's direction was, 'Only think of this: bobby pins, lipstick, wallet, comb, that's it.' It's very abstract." "I just pictured her being able to do this," said Lynch of her scene, "she's like a broken China doll." David Lynch, who once described Sherilyn Fenn as "five feet of heaven in a ponytail" (quoting from a July 1959 record called "What is Love" by The Playmates), said to Banner, who used that description as the title of his article, "She's a mysterious girl and I think that actresses like her who have a mystery – where there's something hiding beneath the surface – are the really interesting ones." "He's very creative and unafraid of taking chances," she said of the director. "I really respect him. He's wonderful." Also during this period, Fenn appeared on the cover and in a nude pictorial in the December 1990 edition of Playboy magazine.

She portrayed John Dillinger's girlfriend Billie Frechette in ABC's 1991 gangster TV movie Dillinger opposite Mark Harmon, and shot the neo-noir black comedy Desire and Hell at Sunset Motel in which she played a sultry, seductive femme fatale.

After Twin Peaks, Fenn chose to focus on widening her range of roles and was determined to avoid typecasting. She stated, "They've offered me every variation on Audrey Horne, none of which were as good or as much fun. She turned down the Audrey Horne spinoff series that was offered to her, and unlike most of the cast, chose not to return for the 1992 prequel movie Twin Peaks: Fire Walk with Me, as she was then shooting Of Mice and Men.

=== Post-Twin Peaks roles (1992–1995) ===
After two nominations (Emmy and Golden Globe) for Twin Peaks, and the pictorial in Playboy, Fenn was propelled to stardom and became a major sex symbol, with her Old Hollywood looks. In October 1990, while promoting Twin Peaks, Fenn made the cover of Rolling Stone magazine along with Mädchen Amick and Lara Flynn Boyle. In 1990 Us Magazine chose her as one of the "10 Most Beautiful Women in the World" and in 1991 People magazine chose her as one of the "50 Most Beautiful Women in the World". She posed for photographer Steven Meisel for the autumn-winter 1991–1992 Dolce & Gabbana campaign, for which he photographed her as a classical Hollywood femme fatale. In 1992, photographer George Hurrell took a series of photographs of Sherilyn Fenn, Julian Sands, Raquel Welch, Eric Roberts and Sean Young. In these portraits, he recreated his style of the 1930s, with Fenn posing in costumes, hairstyle, and makeup of the period.

In 1991, Hollywood acting coach Roy London chose her to star in his directorial debut Diary of a Hitman, in which she plays a young mother determined to protect her child from hitman Forest Whitaker. According to Fenn, the turning point in her career was when she met London in 1990. She credits him with instilling confidence and newfound enthusiasm.

I was disillusioned with acting after the pilot of Twin Peaks. I'd been doing low-budget films. I didn't want to walk through movies being a pretty ornament. At 25 I didn't know if I had it. I questioned if there was depth, if there was integrity to me. I was longing to go inside, to do deeper work.

She learned from her beloved teacher "to find the roles that you're passionate about, that speak to you on some level and which will help you grow on some level," which has then become her line of conduct. "A lot of the sentiment that acting should be about an art form rather than mass entertainment and celebrity is at the core of Fenn's attitude to the business," wrote Jessica Sully in Australian magazine Movie. "I try to keep myself centered," Fenn said. "I don't go to parties and all that. I don't think being seen or being in the right place is going to make me a better actress. I care about my work and try to do what's right in my heart." As Mike Bygrave wrote in Sky Magazine: "One of the keys to understanding Fenn is that when she talks about the characters she plays she's really talking about herself." Fenn was eager to play varied parts that could eclipse her sex-symbol image. "People who think they know me would be surprised that my whole life doesn't revolve around sex," she said. After Twin Peaks, Fenn demanded a no-nudity clause in her contracts. She turned to independent films, choosing varied and unusual roles:

The world has certain rules – Hollywood has certain rules – but it doesn't mean you have to play by them, and I don't, or I'd be a miserable person.

A highlight of Fenn's film career is Gary Sinise's film adaptation of Of Mice and Men, in which she played a sad and lonely country wife, desperately in need to talk to somebody, opposite Sinise and John Malkovich. "Sherilyn's one of the reasons we got such a great ovation at Cannes", said Sinise. "She's like a terribly sad angel in this film. Sherilyn plays against just being a sexy and beautiful girl," he added. "Gary Sinise was one of the first people who didn't see me like a lot of other people did", she said. "It was a wonderful experience. Horton Foote adapted the novel and he fleshed out my character, and he made her much, much more." The same year, she starred alongside Danny Aiello and others in John Mackenzie's Ruby, about Jack Ruby. Fenn played the part of ambitious stripper Sheryl Ann DuJean, a fictitious character who is a composite of several real-life women including stripper Candy Barr, Marilyn Monroe, and Judith Campbell Exner. "She's got a brain and all the right emotional instincts, and that's a great combination," said Mackenzie of Fenn.

In 1993, she starred in the romantic comedy Three of Hearts as Kelly Lynch and William Baldwin's love interest. During the shooting, the relationship between Fenn and director Yurek Bogayevicz became strained as she refused to appear nude in the film.

Another of her notable film roles was in Boxing Helena, directed by David Lynch's daughter Jennifer Chambers Lynch. Fenn portrayed a narcissistic seductress amputated and imprisoned by Julian Sands, who makes her become his personal Venus de Milo in an effort to possess her. Fenn said of the film, "Society, Hollywood, some men... they want to wrap women up in a neat little package." Both Lynch and Fenn were proud of their work in it, but the film was ultimately a critical and commercial failure. However, both women enjoyed their collaboration. "Sherilyn is an amazing actress, a total bundle of energy and a real powerhouse and I think people will see a side of her that we have never seen of Sherilyn anywhere else before," said Lynch of the actress. "Jennifer's one of the brightest person I know," said Fenn. "Boxing Helena was... not perfect, but I think for the story that we were trying to tell, it turned out pretty good. What it signified was really powerful to me: how society puts us in boxes one way or another."

She then starred in Carl Reiner's neo-noir parody Fatal Instinct as Armand Assante's devoted secretary and Sean Young's and Kate Nelligan's rival. She was asked to read for the femme fatale Lola (eventually played by Young), but opted for the secretary role.

Fenn afterward portrayed Potiphar's wife Zulaikha in Showtime's 1995 Biblical TV movie Slave of Dreams opposite Adrian Pasdar and Edward James Olmos.

In 1995, she starred in an episode of Tales from the Crypt directed by Robert Zemeckis, alongside Isabella Rossellini and John Lithgow, in which she played the lover of Humphrey Bogart, who appeared in the episode via CGI special effects.

After a short break during which she married and gave birth to a son, Fenn was chosen out of more than 100 actresses to portray actress Elizabeth Taylor in NBC's 1995 telemovie Liz: The Elizabeth Taylor Story. Fenn called the role "probably the hardest job I've ever done." "Director Kevin Connor and I arranged a lunch, not an audition," said executive producer Lester Persky. "We knew 10 minutes into our meeting that Sherilyn was it. She has the same striking beauty, and because of that she's experienced some of the things in life and in this business that make Elizabeth such a fascinating person." When she accepted the part, Fenn was unaware that Taylor was embroiled in a lawsuit intended to stop both the broadcast of the film and the unauthorized biography that it was based on. Fenn stated about the controversy, "I am somebody who doesn't make choices lightly at this point of my life. I'm not somebody who wants to exploit another's woman story or life in any way." Fenn felt a kinship with Taylor, stating, "There are stereotypes of what a beautiful woman is. She struggled with that. A certain part of her life she went on that calling card. I certainly know I've come into contact with that. 'You are too pretty,' I'm told." During the shooting, Fenn supported the original screenwriter's effort to concentrate on Taylor the person, not the legend:

I fought to keep the integrity of the story because the producer was bringing in a writer that was making it very soapy. They wanted many scenes of her when she was very overweight. I said, 'I'm not doing that. I'll do one. That's not this woman's life.' For me it was just: I didn't want to make an impression. I just tried to play the truth of the woman.

=== Mid-1990s and guest appearances (1996–1998) ===
In the late 1990s, Fenn experienced a career slowdown. In 1993, she had stated:

I don't get considered for a lot of those big fat movies. The studios have their list of five actresses and whether they're right or wrong for a role doesn't matter. It's how much money their last movie made," she said. "Not that I necessarily want to do them anyway. Because there's very few that are big budget that have any substance or any depth or any integrity."

In 1997, she stated: "It was crazy, I was very picky. In other words, I didn't take advantage of what was happening necessarily then." Also, she has attributed her failure to adapt to the Hollywood system to her frankness and her dislike for the "Hollywood game."

I was told once that I didn't play the Hollywood game, and that's why I wasn't a big star. What they meant when they said that was that I don't go to parties, and when I go to an audition and I don't like the script, they know it. I don't flirt and I don't play the people that I'm meeting with. In the next breath, this person said to me, 'When you're passionate about a role, there's nobody that can touch you, but you have to learn to do this also...' But I don't know how to sit there and pretend I love something when I don't!

She began to alternate TV movies and independent films. In 1996, she joined the ensemble cast in the romantic comedy Lovelife as a waitress who attempts to become a writer and has to rebuild her life. Fenn also appeared in the 1997 romantic comedy Just Write, along with Jeremy Piven, as the dream actress of a Hollywood tour bus driver, who mistakes him for a famous screenwriter. Both films have been well-received on the festival circuit.

In a 1997 episode of Friends, "The One with Phoebe's Ex-Partner", which was Episode 14 of Season 3 of the show, Fenn guest-starred as Matt LeBlanc's ex-girlfriend Ginger, who has a prosthetic right leg. She stated, "I like the show. I was happy to be a part of it."

The same year, she was cast as the female lead in ABC's show Prey (originally entitled Hungry for Survival) and starred in the unaired original pilot episode. However, after the filming was done and post-production work almost wrapped up, the studio heads abruptly changed course, replacing Fenn with Debra Messing and reshooting the entire pilot. Prey went on for one season before getting cancelled.

Fenn starred in the 1998 British psychological drama Darkness Falls as a wealthy and neglected wife, who is sequestered with her husband (played by Tim Dutton) by a man (Ray Winstone) determined to understand the events that led to his wife ending up in a coma. Fenn called the film "a wonderful character piece" While shooting the film in the Isle of Man in late 1997, Fenn considered settling in London to start a European career, but eventually decided to stay in the U.S.

=== Return to television: Rude Awakening (1998–2001) ===
Fenn gained newfound enthusiasm with the lead role in Showtime's sitcom Rude Awakening as Billie Frank, an alcoholic ex-soap opera actress, who tries to go sober and become a writer, but continues to struggle with her self-destructive habits. The series ran from 1998 to 2001 and co-starred Lynn Redgrave, Jonathan Penner, and Mario Van Peebles. She said of it:

I liked the hard-core truth of Rude Awakening. But when I first read it, I was scared of it. Part of me was, like, it's so unattractive! But I liked that it didn't glamorize alcohol. And what's admirable about Billie is that she's a straight shooter. She doesn't have a lot of pretense. It's like, 'Take me as I am. You like me, fine! You don't, I don't give a damn!' There's something quite empowering about somebody who doesn't care what other people think. Billie is learning about herself. She's recognized that she has a problem with drugs and alcohol, and she's trying to straighten it out.

Fenn again joined Jeremy Piven in a 1998 episode of Cupid, as Piven's love interest.

In 1999, she reteamed with Chris Penn and Adrian Pasdar for Pasdar's art-house directorial debut, the neo-noir Cement, a contemporary retelling of Othello in which she played a tempting but imprudent wife of jealous corrupt cop Penn. "I play a character who's selfish and sloppy with her sexual energy. I saw the film and I was really happy with it. It's got a lot of soul." The film, which won Best Picture awards on the festival circuit, was written by Farscape's screenwriter, Justin Monjo and also starred Jeffrey Wright and Henry Czerny. She also reteamed with actor/director Bruce Davison for his 2001 family comedy, Showtime's Off Season alongside Rory Culkin, Hume Cronyn, and Adam Arkin.

Fenn subsequently starred alongside Jon Tenney in the pilot for a remake of ABC's Love, American Style, for the 1998–1999 television season. Although the show wasn't picked up, it did air as a TV special on February 20, 1999. Guest stars include Mariska Hargitay, Steven Eckholdt, Fenn, Jon Tenney, Melissa Joan Hart, Matt Letscher, Joely Fisher, Tom Verica, and writer/producer Winnie Holzman (My So-Called Life).

=== 2001–present ===
Following Rude Awakening, Fenn's has made a number of episodic TV appearances. In the middle of the 2000s, she was involved in many projects that went unrealized.

In 2001, she starred in The Outer Limits episode "Replica", playing a scientist who volunteered to be cloned. She also starred in an episode of Night Visions, as a woman who buys a used car possessed by a vengeful spirit. She was cast as a kindergarten teacher for the pilot of the 2001 American version of the British TV show Blind Men, alongside French Stewart. However, the pilot was not ordered into a series.

In 2002, Fenn was one of several former Twin Peaks stars, such as Dana Ashbrook and Mädchen Amick, to have a recurring role on The WB's Dawson's Creek. She guest-starred in three episodes from the fifth season, as Alex Pearl, the seductive manager of the restaurant where Joshua Jackson works. Fenn was afterwards cast as Harley Quinn in The WB's Birds of Prey, but was replaced by Mia Sara before the series began. Fenn starred in the original pilot episode, but dropped out, due to scheduling conflicts, as the show's creators realized that the character Harley Quinn would need to be a bigger part of the show. She also played a manipulative woman in a season-four episode of Law & Order: Special Victims Unit versus both Christopher Meloni and Mariska Hargitay, and appeared in Watching Ellie.

Fenn played a crime boss in the 2002 film Swindle alongside Tom Sizemore. She had a small role in the film The United States of Leland alongside Ryan Gosling, in which she played a mother who captivates a troubled teenage boy.

In 2003, Fenn appeared on The WB's Gilmore Girls as Sasha, the girlfriend of Jess Mariano's estranged father (played by Rob Estes) in the season-three episode "Here Comes the Son", which was the back-door pilot for a California-set spin-off titled Windward Circle that was to have starred Milo Ventimiglia, Estes, and Fenn. But the network dropped the project, citing cost issues due to filming on location in Venice, California.

She played the recurring part of Violet Montgomery on Fox's Boston Public (2003–2004), and appeared in Showtime's Cavedweller (2004) opposite Kyra Sedgwick. In 2004, Fenn joined former co-star Mark Harmon in an episode of NCIS, as an amnesiac woman. She was afterwards cast for the 2004 remake of Mister Ed, planned for the Fox network—but after the pilot was shot, the show's writer/producer, Drake Sather, committed suicide, and the pilot was not aired.

In 2004, Fenn co-starred opposite Traci Lords and Paul Johansson in Emily Skopov's Novel Romance, released in 2006, in which she played a pregnancy shop owner who herself cannot have children. She then appeared in the martial arts film Lesser of Three Evils alongside Ho Sung Pak, Peter Greene, and Roger Guenveur Smith, as the unbalanced and alcoholic wife of a corrupt detective. The film was released in 2009 under the title Fist of the Warrior.

In 2005, Fenn made an appearance on The 4400, playing Jean DeLynn Baker, a 4400 who has the ability to grow toxin-emitting spores on her hands. She also guest-starred on the final episode of Judging Amy.

After finishing the Russia-set action film Treasure Raiders with David Carradine, Fenn starred in the Canadian psychological thriller Presumed Dead, alongside Duncan Regehr, as a detective working on a missing-person case who has to outwit a crime novelist.

In 2006, Fenn reteamed with Amy Sherman-Palladino and reappeared in the sixth and seventh seasons of Gilmore Girls as Anna Nardini, the ex-girlfriend of Luke Danes (played by Scott Patterson) and protective mother to his daughter April. Since the failure of the 2003 Gilmore Girls spin-off project, Sherman-Palladino had continued to want to work with Fenn again, and she wrote the character of Anna with her in mind. When asked why she cast Fenn for two different roles on Gilmore Girls, Sherman-Palladino explained:

I love Sherilyn so much and I don't care. One thing about the show is I just want the best people. I've just been looking constantly for a time to work with Sherilyn, and I'm getting very old and I could just get hit by a truck at any minute. I just simply can't put it off that long, so I'd just rather get her in and have her part of my world.

However, after Sherman-Palladino left the show, the direction for the character changed—the producers decided to make her character a villain in a custody battle.

Fenn was cast as the female lead in ABC's 2006 comedy series Three Moons Over Milford, but she was ultimately replaced by Elizabeth McGovern. Fenn was slated for a recurring role on CBS's 2006 crime drama Smith, but the show was quickly canceled.

She appeared in the 2007 Dukes of Hazzard prequel, The Dukes of Hazzard: The Beginning as Lulu Hogg. "It's just a fun silly role," Fenn said. But having already worked with director Robert Berlinger on Rude Awakening, she wanted to do so again.

In July 2006, shortly after shooting The Dukes of Hazzard prequel, Fenn stepped behind the camera for the first time and directed in Pittsburgh a documentary film about child enrichment program CosmiKids and its founder, Judy Julin. She subsequently joined its executive team in 2007 as executive director of the film and television division. In July 2008, Fenn filmed The Scenesters, a black comedy made by Los Angeles-based comedy group The Vacationeers, which premiered in October 2009. In July 2009, Fenn made a guest appearance on In Plain Sight as a lesbian counterfeiter.

In December 2010, Fenn appeared on Psych with other Twin Peaks actors on the season 5 episode "Dual Spires" as sultry librarian Maudette Hornsby. The episode paid homage to Twin Peaks with many references to the show. She reprised her role as Audrey Horne in 2017 for the third season of Twin Peaks. In February 2016, she joined the cast of the American version of Shameless.

In 2016, Fenn wrote and published a children's book titled No Man's Land, about a boy who has autism. She was inspired to write the book after her second son, Christian, was diagnosed with autism.

In 2017, Fenn starred in S.W.A.T. as Karen Street, Jim Street's estranged mother.

In 2022, Sherilyn portrayed Sarah Jane McCubbin, a widow with dementia who plans to be euthanized by her mentally imbalanced son in the psychological drama Losing Addison.

== Personal life ==
Fenn dated pop singer Prince for a short time during 1985 and then actor Johnny Depp the same year; their relationship lasted a few years.

In 1993, Fenn welcomed a son, named Myles, with guitarist-songwriter Toulouse Holliday, whom she met on the set of Three of Hearts. The two were married between 1994 and 1997.

In 2007, from her relationship with Dylan Stewart, Fenn gave birth to her second son, Christian.

Fenn began practicing Transcendental Meditation in 2014.

== Awards and nominations ==
- 1990: Nominated for an Emmy Award for Outstanding Supporting Actress in a Drama Series – Twin Peaks
- 1991: Nominated for a Golden Globe Award for Best Performance by an Actress in a Supporting Role in a Series, Mini-Series or Motion Picture Made for TV – Twin Peaks

== Other recognition ==
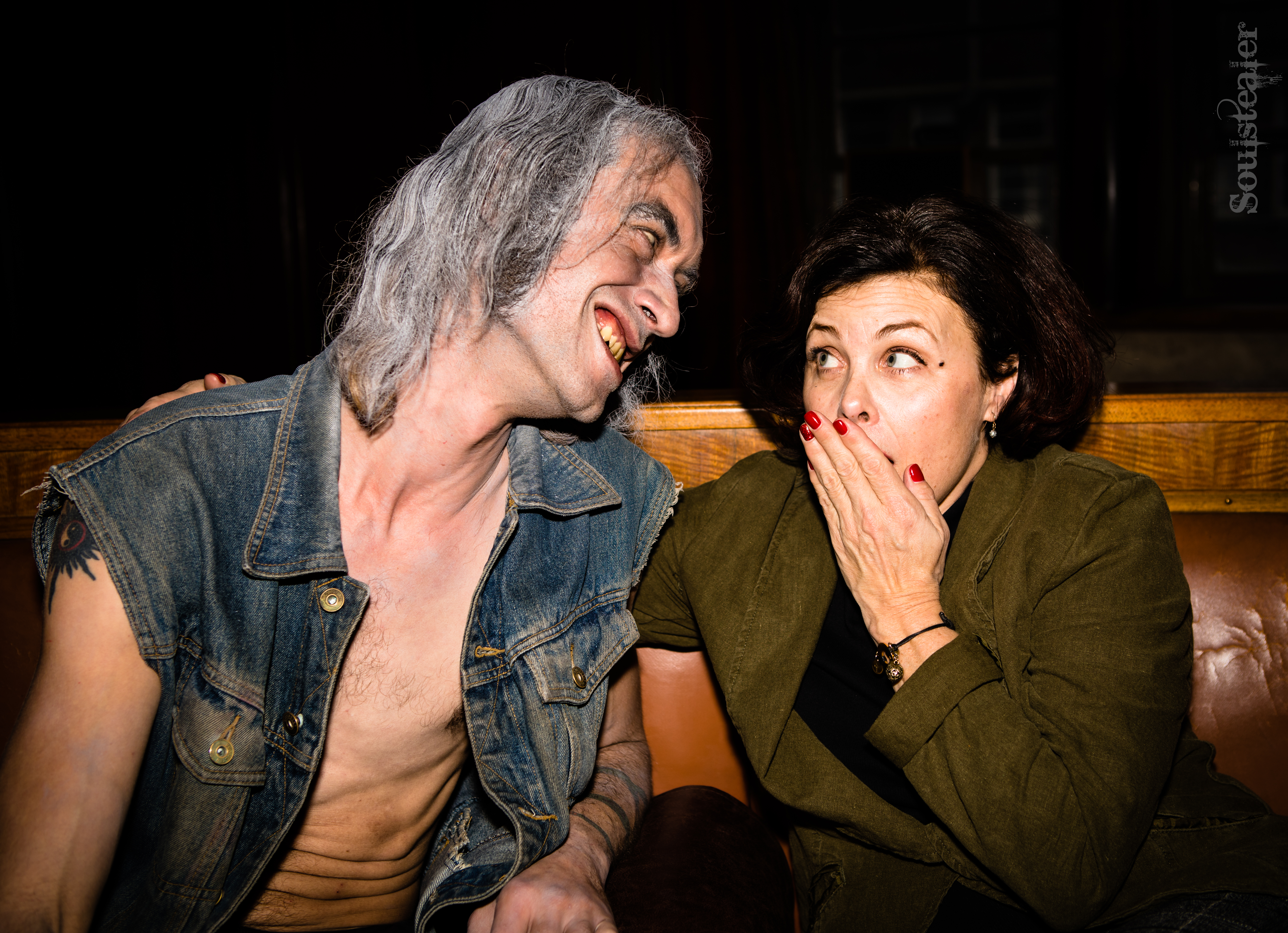
Sherilyn Fenn (right) with a Killer BOB cosplayer (left) in London, England, 2017

- Fenn made the cover of such magazines as New York, Rolling Stone (along with Mädchen Amick and Lara Flynn Boyle), Playboy, Entertainment Weekly, The Face, Details, Sky, and Harper's Bazaar.
- In 1990, Us Weekly chose her as one of the "10 Most Beautiful Women in the World".
- In 1991, People chose her as one of the "50 Most Beautiful Women in the World".
- Fenn posed for photographer Steven Meisel for the autumn–winter 1991–1992 Dolce & Gabbana campaign.
- In 1992, Fenn posed for photographer George Hurrell.
- Singer and composer Screamin' Jay Hawkins wrote and recorded the 1993 song entitled "Sherilyn Fenn", featured on his album Stone Crazy. The song is an ode to Fenn, who worked with Hawkins in Two Moon Junction.
- Fenn is mentioned in the song "Razor Burn" by the punk band Lagwagon on their 1995 album Hoss.
- In 1995, FHM chose her as one of the "100 sexiest women in the world".
- In 1996, the Daily Mirror chose her as one of the "World's 100 Most Beautiful Women", and Femme Fatales chose her as one of the "50 sexiest sci-fi actresses".
- Fenn inspired Norwegian hard rock band Audrey Horne, formed in 2002, named after her character in Twin Peaks.
- In 2006, Australian men's magazine Zoo Weekly chose her as one of the "Top 50 Hottest Babes Ever".
- In 2020, Fenn attended the inaugural Fayetteville Comic Show along with numerous actors from Twin Peaks (James Marshall, Ray Wise, etc.)
- In the Dutch graphic novel comedy series about their hero Gilles de Geus, which is set during the formation of the Netherlands during the 80-year war against Spain, creators Hanco Kolk and Peter de Wit modeled their femme fatale spy, 90-60-90, after Fenn.

== Filmography ==
=== Film ===
Year	Title	Role	Notes
1984	The Wild Life	Penny Harlin	
1984	Silence of the Heart	Monica	TV movie
1985	Out of Control	Katie	
1985	Just One of the Guys	Sandy	
1985	Dummies	-	Short
1986	Thrashin'	Velvet	
1986	The Wraith	Keri Johnson	
1987	Zombie High	Suzi	
1988	Two Moon Junction	April Delongpre	
1988	Crime Zone	Helen	
1989	True Blood	Jennifer Scott	
1990	Meridian	Catherine Bomarzini	Video
1990	Wild at Heart	Girl in Accident	
1990	Backstreet Dreams	Lucy	
1991	Dillinger	Billie Frechette	TV movie
1991	Desire and Hell at Sunset Motel	Bridget 'Bridey' DeSoto	
1991	Diary of a Hitman	Jain Zidzyck	
1992	Ruby	Sheryl Ann 'Candy Cane' DuJean	
1992	Of Mice and Men	Curley's wife	
1993	Boxing Helena	Helena	
1993	Three of Hearts	Ellen Armstrong	
1993	Fatal Instinct	Laura Lincolnberry	
1994	Spring Awakening	Margie	TV movie
1995	Liz: The Elizabeth Taylor Story	Elizabeth Taylor	TV movie
1995	Slave of Dreams	Zulaikha	TV movie
1996	The Assassination File	Lauren Jacobs	TV movie
1997	Just Write	Amanda Clark	
1997	Lovelife	Molly	
1997	The Don's Analyst	Isabella Leoni	TV movie
1997	The Shadow Men	Dez Wilson	
1998	Nightmare Street	Joanna Burke/Sarah Randolph	
1998	Outside Ozona	Marcy Duggan Rice	
1999	Darkness Falls	Sally Driscoll	
2000	Cement	Lyndel Holt	
2001	Off Season	Patty Winslow	TV movie
2002	Swindle	Sophie Zenn	
2002	Scent of Danger	Brenna Shaw	TV movie
2003	The United States of Leland	Angela Calderon	
2003	Nightwaves	Shelby Naylor	TV movie
2003	Dream Warrior	Sterling	
2004	Cavedweller	M.T.	
2004	Pop Rocks	Allison Harden	TV movie
2005	Deadly Isolation	Susan Mandaway	TV movie
2005	Officer Down	Detective Kathryn Shaunessy	TV movie
2006	Presumed Dead	Det. Mary Anne 'Coop' Cooper	TV movie
2006	Novel Romance	Liza Normane Stewart	
2006	Whitepaddy	Karen Greenly	
2007	The Dukes of Hazzard: The Beginning	Lulu Hogg	TV movie
2007	Treasure Raiders	Lena	
2009	Fist of the Warrior	Katie Barnes	
2009	The Scenesters	A.D.A. Barbara Dietrichson	
2012	Bigfoot	Sheriff Becky Alvarez	TV movie
2013	Raze	Elizabeth	
2013	Bump	Mother	Short
2014	The Brittany Murphy Story	Sharon Murphy	TV movie
2014	Rescuing Madison	Bess	TV movie
2015	Unnatural	Dr. Hannah Lindval	
2016	Casa Vita	Marlene Lindstrom	TV movie
2016	The Secrets of Emily Blair	Linda Regan	
2017	Fatal Defense	Inspector Banks	TV movie
2017	Wish Upon	Mrs. Deluca	
2019	The Killers	Laura	Short
2020	Shooting Heroin	Hazel	
2021	Something About Her	Charlene	
2021	Immortalist	Laura Spersoni	
2022	Losing Addison	Sarah Jane McCubbin	
2022	Enough Sleep	Denise (voice)	Short
2023	Silent Life: The Story of the Lady in Black	Alla Nazimova	
2023	Upon Waking	Andrea	

=== Television ===
Year	Title	Role	Notes
1985	Cheers	Gabrielle	Episode: "The Groom Wore Clearasil"
1986	Heart of the City	Lisa Harper	Episode: "The Chemistry of Rage"
1987	21 Jump Street	Diane Nelson	Episode: "Blindsided"
1987	Tales from the Hollywood Hills	Betty	Episode: "A Table at Ciro's"
1988	ABC Afterschool Special	Beth	Episode: "A Family Again"
1989	TV 101	Robin Zimmer	Episodes: "The Last Temptation of Checker Part: 1 & 2"
1990–91	Twin Peaks	Audrey Horne	Main Cast
1995	Tales from the Crypt	Erika	Episode: "You, Murderer"
1996	A Season in Purgatory	Kit Bradley	Episodes: "Part: 1 & 2"
1997	Friends	Ginger	Episode: "The One with Phoebe's Ex-Partner"
1998	Cupid	Helen Davis	Episode: "Pick-Up Schticks"
1998–2001	Rude Awakening	Billie Frank	Main Cast
1999	Love, American Style	Nancy	Episode: "Love and the Jealous Lover"
2001	The Outer Limits	Nora Griffiths/Nora's clone	Episode: "Replica"
2001	Night Visions	Charlotte	Episode: "Used Car"
2002	Watching Ellie	Vanessa	Recurring Cast: Season 1
2002	Dawson's Creek	Alexandra 'Alex' Pearl	Recurring Cast: Season 5
2002	Law & Order: Special Victims Unit	Gloria Stanfield	Episode: "Deception"
2003	Gilmore Girls	Sasha	Episode: "Here Comes the Son"
2003–04	Boston Public	Violet Montgomery	Recurring Cast: Season 4
2004	NCIS	Jane Doe/Suzzanne McNeil	Episode: "Left for Dead"
2004	Century Cities	Bree Clemens	Episode: "The Face Was Familiar"
2005	Judging Amy	Heather Reid	Episode: "My Name Is Amy Gray..."
2005	The 4400	Jean DeLynn Baker	Episode: "Carrier"
2006	CSI: Miami	Gwen Creighton	Episode: "Open Water"
2006–07	Gilmore Girls	Anna Nardini	Recurring Cast: Season 6-7
2007	Smith	Debbie Turkenson	Episode: "Six"
2008	House M.D.	Mrs. Soellner	Episode: "Joy to the World"
2009	In Plain Sight	Helen Trask/Helen Traylen	Episode: "Let's Get It Ahn"
2010	Psych	Maudette Hornsby	Episode: "Dual Spires"
2013	Magic City	Madame Renee	Recurring Cast: Season 2
2014	CSI: Crime Scene Investigation	Madame Suzanne	Episode: "Love For Sale"
2014	Ray Donovan	Donna Cochran	Recurring Cast: Season 2
2016	Shameless	Queenie Slott	Recurring Cast: Season 6
2016	Major Crimes	Marsha Walker	Episode: "Off the Wagon"
2016	Criminal Minds	Gloria Barker	Episode: "Taboo"
2017	Confess	Lydia	Main Cast
2017	Twin Peaks	Audrey Horne	Recurring Cast
2017–21	S.W.A.T.	Karen Street	Recurring Cast: Season 1-2 & 4
2018	Robot Chicken	Mummy Pig/Mama Dinosaur (voices)	Episode: "He's Not Even Aiming at the Toilet"
2018	Titans	Melissa Roth	Episode: "Titans"
2019	The Magicians	Etta	Episode: "Lost, Found, Fucked"
2019	Goliath	Bobbi	Recurring Cast: Season 3
2020	Little America	Laura Bush	Episode: "The Manager"
2022–23	Shining Vale	Robyn Court	Recurring Cast
2027	Scooby-Doo: Origins	TBA	Filming

== Music video ==
- Bunbury – "Deseos de usar y tirar" (2020)

== Bibliography ==
- No Man's Land, 2016, ISBN 978-1941822692
