= Swindle (2002 film) =

- Directed by: K.C. Bascombe
- Written by: K.C. Bascombe
- Produced by: Nick Seferian
- Starring: Tom Sizemore; Sherilyn Fenn; Dave Foley
- Release date: 2002
- Country: United States

Swindle is a 2002 crime thriller film written and directed by K.C. Bascombe and starring Tom Sizemore, Sherilyn Fenn and Dave Foley.

== Plot ==
Sophie Zen has master-minded a bank robbery. What she doesn't know is that one of her crew, Seth George, is an undercover cop. George is a maverick; even his police bosses don't know whether he's still on their side, and the undercover man is starting to fall for Sophie...

== Cast ==
- Tom Sizemore as Seth George
- Sherilyn Fenn as Sophie Zenn
- Dave Foley as Michael Barnes
- Conrad Pla as Cisco
- Katie Griffin as Judy

== See also ==
- Girls with guns
