= Treasure Raiders =

Treasure Raiders is a 2007 independently produced treasure-hunt film, directed by Brent Huff and written by Alexander Izotov and Alexey Overchuk, starring Steven Brand, David Carradine, Sherilyn Fenn and Russian actor Alexander Nevsky. The film was released by Maverick Entertainment Group and is a Czar Pictures/Parliament World Group/Lightning Entertainment co-production.

== Plot ==
A Russian street racing star named Wolf (Nevsky)---who also happens to be the leader of an anti-illegal drug vigilante group---meets his match in a sly American archeology professor named Michael Nazzaro (Brand) who has developed a liking for drag racing on Moscow's streets in order to follow Wolf. The professor, a West Pointer and the descendant of a Templar knight, is in possession of a 16th-century book passed on to him through generations in his family, and is now interested in the Templar medallion in Wolf's possession. The medallion is the professor's key to decoding a name in another Templar book he had come to Moscow to find, a copy of the Gospel of Jacques de Molay. Having made some wealth from an archeological find in Colombia prior to coming to Moscow, the professor offers to bet $50,000 for the medallion in a drag race with Wolf. It turns out Wolf is a likely Russian descendant of a Templar knight himself. Although the professor fails to win the medallion, Wolf joins him in his quest to find the book after a Colombian drug cartel and Russian mafia alliance goes after him. Meanwhile, a well-known historian (Carradine), a descendant of a Persecutor of the Knights, has also been following the professor in order to destroy his find. To make matters worse, the Moscow police suspect that the professor and Wolf are part of the developing Colombian drug trade in the city and order units to arrest the duo. With time, police, and the mafia against them, will they find the treasure before it is too late?

== Cast ==
- Alexander Nevsky as Wolf
- Steven Brand as Michael Nazzaro
- David Carradine as Pierre
- Sherilyn Fenn as Lena
- Robert Madrid as Dr. Pablo Ramirez
- Andrew Divoff as Cronin
- William Shockley as Beekeeper
- Olga Rodionova as Masha Bolkov
- Albert Filozov as Curator
- Maksim Konovalov as Bolt (as Maxim Konovalov)
- Maksim Pokrovsky as Gorinych (as Max Pokrovsky)
- Yegor Pazenko as Igor (as Egor Pazenko)
- Stanislav Kucher as Officer Petrov
- Ekaterina Ryndenkova as Lida
- Francesca Carlin as Officer Tzyu (as Franceska Carlin)
