= Holly Goodhead =

Dr. Holly Goodhead
- 'James Bond' character
- Lois Chiles as Dr. Holly Goodhead
- First appearance: Moonraker (1979)
- Created by: Christopher Wood
- Portrayed by: Lois Chiles; Jane Perry (video game)

In-universe information
- Gender: Female
- Occupation: CIA operative Astronaut; Astrophysicist
- Affiliation: CIA; NASA
- Nationality: American

Dr. Holly Goodhead is a fictional character in the James Bond film franchise, portrayed by Lois Chiles in the 1979 film Moonraker. She is an active CIA operative, former NASA astronaut, astrophysicist, and Vassar College graduate. She does not appear in Ian Fleming's original 1955 novel; the character was created for the screen by screenwriter Christopher Wood, sharing thematic similarities with the novel's female lead, Gala Brand.

== Appearances ==
In Moonraker (1979), Dr. Goodhead is working undercover at Drax Industries under the guise of an astronaut and researcher while covertly investigating industrialist Hugo Drax (Michael Lonsdale) on behalf of the CIA. She first encounters MI6 agent James Bond (Roger Moore) while giving him a tour of Drax's California aerospace facility. The two cross paths again during respective investigations in Venice and Rio de Janeiro. Initially distrustful of one another, they eventually pool their intelligence after surviving an assassination attempt by Drax's henchman Jaws (Richard Kiel) and realizing their agencies share the same objective.

After being captured by Drax's forces, Bond and Goodhead escape and board the space shuttle Moonraker 6 to reach Drax's orbital space station. Because Bond lacks the training to operate the vessel, Goodhead pilots the shuttle into orbit. On the station, they disable the radar cloaking device, allowing a United States Marine Corps space platoon to board. With the help of a reformed Jaws, Bond and Goodhead thwart Drax's scheme to eradicate humanity with nerve gas, and Goodhead pilots the armed Moonraker 5 to destroy the remaining toxin globes before they enter Earth's atmosphere. After defeating Drax, Bond and Goodhead are caught on a live video link making love by their superiors in Washington and London, closing the film with Goodhead requesting that Bond take her "around the world one more time."

The character also makes a brief appearance in the 2012 video game 007 Legends, voiced by British-Canadian actress Jane Perry.

== Production and casting ==
Eon Productions originally approached Lois Chiles to play the leading Bond girl, Major Anya Amasova, in the previous film, The Spy Who Loved Me (1977). Chiles declined the role as she was taking a temporary hiatus from acting at the time.

Casting for Dr. Goodhead in Moonraker occurred serendipitously. Director Lewis Gilbert happened to sit next to Chiles on a commercial flight. Recognizing her and learning she was ready to return to acting, Gilbert formally offered her the role of Dr. Goodhead.

Screenwriter Christopher Wood deliberately developed the character to reflect the contemporary professional advancements of women in the late 1970s. By giving her extensive scientific credentials, combat training, and CIA background (humorously attributed in the film to her time at Vassar College), the producers intended to create a heroine who could operate as Bond's intellectual and physical equal.

== Analysis and reception ==
In the context of late-1970s cinema, Goodhead was marketed as a modern response to the women's liberation movement, reflecting Eon Productions' conscious effort to feature female characters with independent professional agency. Upon the film's release in 1979, critics noted the shift; while earlier Bond women were often passive, Goodhead's character demonstrated technical competence and authority. Film historian James Chapman observes that the partnership between Bond and Goodhead also reflects the Special Relationship between the United Kingdom and the United States. Chapman notes that as an active CIA operative who possesses critical technical skills that 007 lacks—specifically piloting the space shuttle to reach Drax's orbital base—Goodhead functions as a narrative equal rather than a conventional damsel in distress.

However, retrospective critiques of the character frequently highlight the cognitive dissonance between her formidable qualifications as a scientist and CIA officer and her overtly suggestive double-entendre name, a recurring trope of the franchise's Roger Moore era. While some feminist film critics praise Goodhead for repeatedly saving Bond and driving the narrative forward, others argue her character's progressive traits are ultimately undermined by the inherent sexism of the franchise's naming conventions and romantic tropes.
