= Rude Awakening (TV series) =

American television series (1998–2001)

- Rude Awakening opening title
- Genre: Sitcom
- Created by: Claudia Lonow
- Starring: Sherilyn Fenn; Lynn Redgrave; Jonathan Penner; Rain Pryor; Roger E. Mosley; Mario Van Peebles
- Opening theme: "Another Rude Awakening" by Alana Davis (seasons 1–2) and Roger Daltrey (season 3)
- Country of origin: United States
- No. of seasons: 3
- No. of episodes: 55 (list of episodes)

Production
- Executive producers: Claudia Lonow; Scott Sanders
- Camera setup: Single-camera
- Running time: 30 minutes
- Production companies: Mandalay Television; Lions Gate Television (1999–2001) (seasons 2–3); Columbia TriStar Television Distribution; Showtime Networks

Original release
- Network: Showtime
- Release: August 1, 1998 – February 15, 2001

Rude Awakening is an American television sitcom created by Claudia Lonow and starring Sherilyn Fenn, broadcast on Showtime from August 1, 1998 to February 15, 2001, spanning 55 episodes over three seasons.

== Story ==
Rude Awakening tells the story of Billie Frank, an out of work alcoholic ex-soap-opera actress. She tries to go sober and become a writer but continues to struggle with her self-destructive habits. The show depicts her relations with other members of Addictions Anonymous, (Note: name used on-air for the group, a nod to Alcoholics Anonymous) her neighbor Dave, and her mother, Trudy.

== Episodes ==
Season	Episodes	Originally released	
Season	Episodes	First released	Last released
1	13	August 1, 1998	November 7, 1998
2	22	June 26, 1999	March 18, 2000
3	20	June 29, 2000	February 15, 2001

== Cast ==
=== Main ===
- Sherilyn Fenn as Billie Frank
- Lynn Redgrave as Trudy Frank
- Jonathan Penner as Dave Parelli
- Rain Pryor as Jackie Garcia (seasons 1–2)
- Roger E. Mosley as Milton "Milt" Johnson (season 2)
- Mario Van Peebles as Marcus Adams (season 3)

=== Recurring ===
- Paul Ben-Victor as Carl
- Corinne Bohrer as Tish Frank
- Dan Finnerty as Joe the Bartender
- Tom Gallop as Jerry Frank
- Jason Graae as Chad
- Richard Lewis as Harve Schwartz
- Mark Lonow as Max Frank
- Ana Mercedes as Antonia the Maid
- Beverly D'Angelo as Sidney 'Syd' Gibson (season 2)
- Taylor Dayne as Maureen (seasons 2–3)
- Tim Curry as Martin Crisp (seasons 2–3)
- Jack Plotnick as Clark (seasons 2–3)
- Roger Daltrey as Nobby Clegg (season 2)
- George Katt as Zack (season 2)
- Elizabeth Lackey as Raquel (season 3)
- Salli Richardson as Nancy Adams (season 3)
- Jenny Robertson as Haley (season 3)

=== Notable guest stars ===
- Karen Black as Crystal Garcia
- Jennifer Coolidge as Sue
- Lana Parrilla as Nurse Lorna
- Ron Glass as Marcus' father
- CCH Pounder as Tracy
- Beverly D'Angelo as Sidney Gibson
- Jason Bateman as Ryan
- Tim Curry as Martin Crisp
- Roger Daltrey as Nobby Clegg
- Martin Lewis as Nigel
- Michelle Phillips as Vivian
- Alan Young as Priest
