= Karen Montgomery =

American actress

- Born: Karen Rose Montgomery; November 28, 1949; Chicago, Illinois, U.S.
- Died: December 4, 2015 (aged 66); Los Angeles, California
- Education: University of California, Berkeley
- Occupations: Actress; film producer
- Years active: 1978—1993
- Known for: Angel One; Coast to Coast
- Spouse: Christopher Monger

Karen Rose Montgomery (November 28, 1949 – December 4, 2015) was an American actress and producer. Born in Chicago, Montgomery and her family later moved to California, where she graduated from UC Berkeley.

She appeared on multiple television series including Kojak, Nero Wolfe, Aloha Paradise and L.A. Law. She played Mistress Beata, the Elected One of the titular planet, in the Star Trek: The Next Generation episode "Angel One". Montgomery later worked as a producer for several television shows, and independent films. She and her husband Christopher Monger produced a documentary about Roy London in 2005. It was shown at the Tribeca Film Festival.

Montgomery died of breast cancer in Los Angeles on December 4, 2015, aged 66.

== Filmography ==
Actress

- Going in Style (1979)
- Coast to Coast (1980)
- Willie & Phil (1980)
- Amazon Women on the Moon (1987)
- Star Trek: The Next Generation (1987)

Producer

- Diary of a Hitman (1991)
- 'Til There Was You (1997)
- Row Your Boat (1998)
