= Roy London =

American actor (1943–1993)

- Born: March 3, 1943; Manhattan, New York, U.S.
- Died: August 8, 1993 (aged 50); Los Angeles, California, U.S.
- Occupations: Actor, acting coach, writer, director, playwright, teacher
- Partner: Tim Healey

Roy London (March 3, 1943 – August 8, 1993) was an American actor, acting coach, director, and teacher.

== Early life ==
London was born and raised on the Upper West Side of Manhattan, New York City. A math prodigy at age five, London was on the radio show Quiz Kids and was educated at the experimental elementary school at Hunter College, New York City. In 1948, the school, featured in Life, shows little Roy telling an arresting tale of death, transfiguration, and group marriage involving Walt Disney's Mickey Mouse and Donald Duck. To graduate at 20 from Antioch College, in Yellow Springs, Ohio, London wrote a paper that combined mathematical concepts and the precepts of theater.

== Acting ==
Upon returning to New York City in 1963, he found work, both on Broadway and in the burgeoning off-Broadway scene. He studied acting at the Herbert Berghof Studio with Uta Hagen and was an integral member of Joseph Chaiken's avant garde Open Theater. During this era, London lived with Pulitzer Prize-winning playwright Lanford Wilson.

In the late 1970s when London was on tour with Lynn Redgrave and performing on stage at the Huntington Hartford Theater in Los Angeles, he decided to stay in Hollywood. As an actor, he appeared on television in programs as widely diverse as WNET's USA Writer's segment about Catcher in the Rye, (London is the only person to have professionally portrayed Holden Caulfield with J.D. Salinger's approval) to the daytime soap opera The Edge of Night, where he was popular as a peeping tom for several seasons. In commercials, London was an everyman, playing one of the Tang astronauts, the Williams Lectric Shave man, the Western Auto man, and innumerable others. He appeared on Falcon Crest, Hill Street Blues, Newhart, Momma's Place, Fatal Vision, and many more. In feature films, after a bit part in The Magic Garden of Stanley Sweetheart, London went on to roles in Hardcore with George C. Scott, Antonioni's Zabriskie Point, William Friedkin's Rampage, and other films.

== Writing ==
London was an original member and a resident playwright of Circle Repertory Company in Greenwich Village. He won the Peabody Award for a radio play and had three books of plays published by Dramatists Play Service. In addition, he was awarded the National Endowment for the Arts Fellowship in creative writing and the New York State Grant in creative writing.

London's television projects included a two-hour Movie of the Week for NBC, California Gold Rush. He wrote several screenplays, including Tiger Warsaw, starring Patrick Swayze and Piper Laurie.

== Directing ==
London debuted as a television director with episodes of Showtime’s It's Garry Shandling's Show. Later, he directed episodes of Shandling's HBO series, The Larry Sanders Show, for which he received a Cable Ace Award nomination. In 1992, London’s first feature film as a director, Diary of a Hitman, was released, starring Forest Whitaker, Sherilyn Fenn, Sharon Stone, and Lois Chiles

== Teaching ==
In the last 15 years of his life, he became an acting teacher in Hollywood. He has been cited as a new influence on film acting. He taught over 250 actors weekly and coached many more privately. In addition to preparing his clients for performances, London also was called upon to help develop and shape their projects. His knowledge of writing, combined with his experience of having acted in over 150 roles on Broadway, off-Broadway, the Royal Shakespeare Company, feature films, and television, helped actors reveal material in dynamic ways.

London's classes began in his living room and spread by word of mouth. In 1984, he moved to his own studio, but he never put a sign on the door, listed the phone number, advertised the classes, nor publicized his teaching. His students, who have thanked him on the Academy Awards, the Golden Globe Awards, the MTV Movie Awards, and more, as well as countless newspapers, magazines, and autobiographies, have remembered London fondly.

== Personal life ==
London's partner in life and work for his last 10 years was Tim Healey; they had a commitment ceremony in 1988.

London was mid-preproduction for his second feature film as a director when he became ill and died from complications due to AIDS. London is buried in a cemetery overlooking the ocean in Santa Barbara, where he shared a home with Healey.

== Recognition ==
A documentary about his work, Special Thanks to Roy London, premiered at the Tribeca Film Festival in 2005. It features interviews with over 50 of his students and friends, including Sharon Stone, Sherilyn Fenn, Jeff Goldblum, Patrick Swayze, Patricia Arquette, Hank Azaria, Geena Davis, Famke Janssen, Garry Shandling, Lanford Wilson, Lois Chiles, Elizabeth Berkley, Drew Carey, and Janel Moloney. It was produced by Karen Montgomery and Christopher Monger.

Garry Shandling, Sharon Stone’s long-time friend and fellow student of Roy London's, presented her with the inaugural Roy London Award in 2007 for her tireless efforts and steadfast commitment to the fight against AIDS.
