= Lois Chiles =

American actress and model (born 1947)

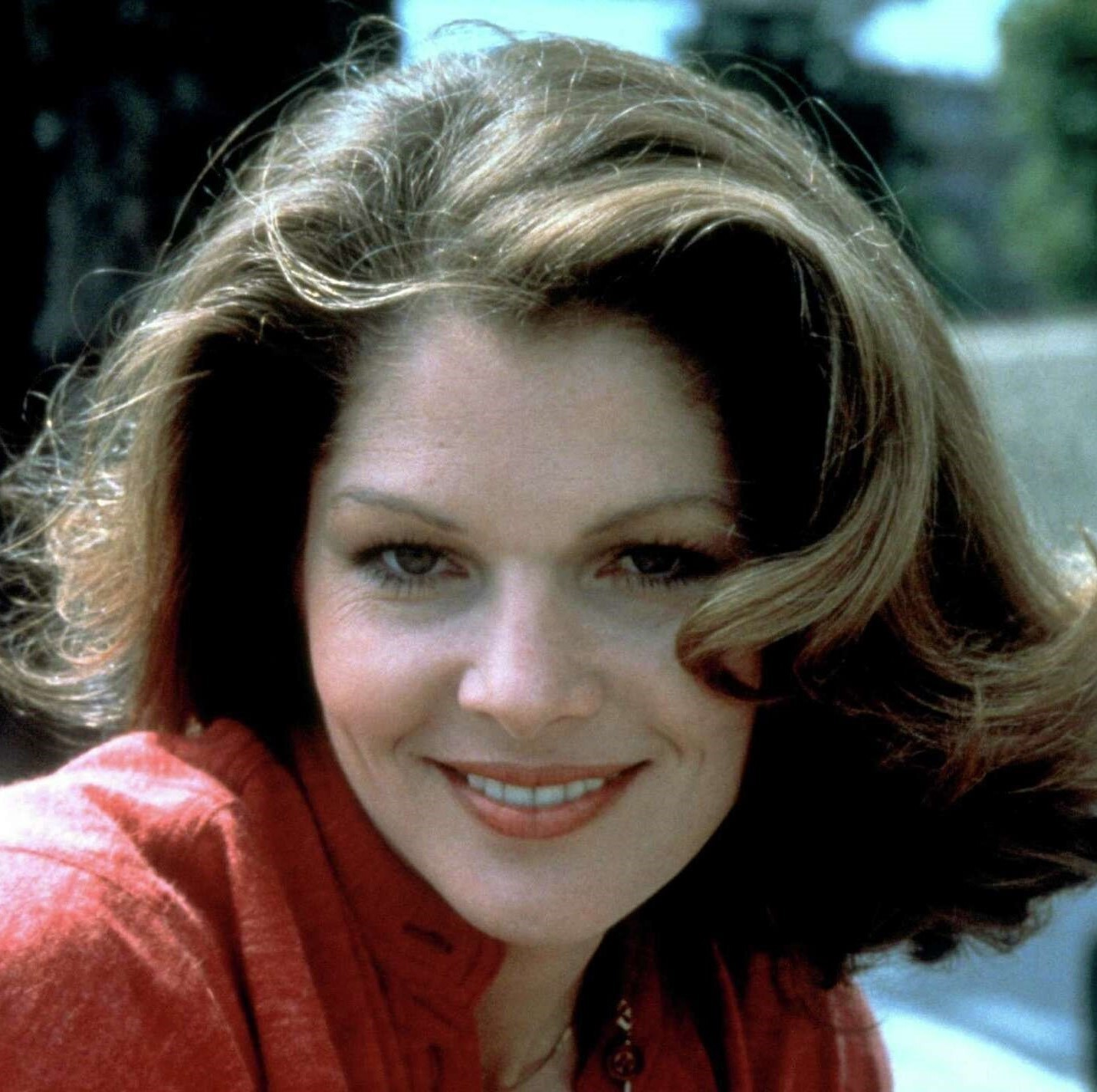
- Studio portrait (1979)
- Born: Lois Cleveland Chiles; April 15, 1947 (age 79); Houston, Texas, U.S.
- Occupations: Actress; model
- Years active: 1972–2006; 2024–present
- Spouse: Richard Gilder (m. 2005; died 2020)
- Relatives: Eddie Chiles (uncle)

Lois Cleveland Chiles (born April 15, 1947) is an American actress and former fashion model known for her role as Holly Goodhead in the James Bond film Moonraker (1979). Her other screen credits include The Way We Were (1973), The Great Gatsby (1974), Death on the Nile (1978), Broadcast News (1987), and the television role of Holly Harwood on Dallas (1982–1983).

== Early and personal life ==
Chiles was born in Houston, the daughter of Marion Clay Chiles and Barbara Wayne Kirkland Chiles. Her paternal uncle was oil tycoon and Texas Rangers owner Eddie Chiles. . Her brother, Clay Kirkland Chiles, died in 1979 . Her only other brother, William Edmonds Chiles, retired as president and CEO of Bristow Group, Inc. She was raised in Alice, Texas.

Chiles studied at the University of Texas at Austin and the former Finch College in New York City, where she was discovered by a Glamour editor looking for a young woman to feature on the cover of the magazine's annual college issue. She landed the job and soon had contracts with Wilhelmina Models in New York and Elite Models in Paris. Later, she studied acting under Roy London and Sandy Meisner, among many others. In her New York years, she befriended Tennessee Williams, Andy Warhol, Maureen Stapleton, and models Patty Hanson and Grace Jones.

Chiles moved from New York to Los Angeles around 1978 to focus only on acting, leaving her modeling career behind. During this time, she lost her younger brother to cancer. Clay Chiles was 25 when he died in 1978 at M.D. Anderson of non-Hodgkins lymphoma. Her brother's death affected Chiles deeply.

Chiles dated Eagles founding member, musician Don Henley, but their relationship eventually ended. Later for a time, she dated William S. Paley. In 2005, she married money manager Richard Gilder. They were both honorary co-chairs of Northfield Mount Hermon, a school in Massachusetts. Gilder donated money to the school and they named the Chiles Theater after her. Gilder died in 2020.

== Career ==
Chiles enjoyed a successful modeling career in the early 1970s. After her role in the 1972 blaxploitation film Together for Days opposite Clifton Davis, Chiles appeared in supporting roles in some of the biggest films of the 1970s. She played the college girlfriend of Robert Redford in the 1973 studio release The Way We Were. She was then cast as Jordan Baker in The Great Gatsby (1974) alongside Mia Farrow and, once again, Redford. She again shared the screen with Farrow in the Agatha Christie adaptation Death on the Nile (1978). She also appeared in a small but key role in the thriller Coma (1978).

In her most famous role as NASA astronaut, scientist, and Bond girl Dr. Holly Goodhead, Chiles appeared opposite Roger Moore in Moonraker (1979). Chiles had initially been approached to star in the previous Bond film The Spy Who Loved Me, but she declined the role because she was taking a break from acting at the time.

She appeared in the music video for the Tony Powers song Odyssey in 1982.

Chiles lost her youngest brother to non-Hodgkin's lymphoma in 1978, which contributed to her decision to take a three-year hiatus from acting. The time away took a toll on her film career, and she struggled to find roles of the caliber she previously enjoyed. Still, she appeared as a season-long guest star in the 1982–1983 season of television's Dallas, playing independent oil heiress Holly Harwood who becomes entangled with Bobby and J.R. Ewing. Her film roles were smaller, though film critic Pauline Kael gave her good notices for her performances in Alan Alda's Sweet Liberty (1986) and her portrayal of reporter Jennifer Mack in James L. Brooks' Broadcast News (1987) was also well received, as was her turn in George A. Romero's horror flick Creepshow 2 in 1987, as a hit-and-run driver. In 1989, she appeared uncredited in a cameo as the estranged mother of Ione Skye's character in Say Anything... (1989).

In 1985, she appeared as "Maggie" in Cat on a Hot Tin Roof in Los Angeles opposite Terence Knox and directed by Jose Ferrer. She stated that it was a major personal triumph to play the demanding role for her as she was not stage-trained.

She has since appeared as a stuffy high-school principal in the 1996 Disney film Wish Upon a Star, and as a frightened cruise passenger in the critically panned Speed 2: Cruise Control in 1997. She made a cameo appearance in the international release of the 1997 Bond spoof Austin Powers: International Man of Mystery, though her scene was cut from the United States release.

Other episodic television work included guest appearances in series such as Hart to Hart (as a psychotic split-personality model), In the Heat of the Night, Murder, She Wrote, and The Nanny. Later career high points included the indie films Diary of a Hitman (1991) and Curdled (1996). In 2005, friend Quentin Tarantino, with whom she had previously worked on the set of Curdled, recruited her to appear in the two-episode Season 5 finale of CSI: Crime Scene Investigation, which he wrote and directed.

In the spring of 2002, she taught a course in film acting at the University of Houston.

Unlike some "Bond girls", Chiles has said that "being a Bond girl is a fun way to be remembered", although she jokes that being asked to sigh "Oh, James" is annoying because "you can't live up to people's fantasies". On other occasions, she stated "I'm proud I'm a Bond Girl. It's not bad at all."

Mostly retired from film, she has spent her later years focusing on art and dividing her time between Houston and New York.

== Filmography ==
Year	Title	Role	Notes
1972	Together for Days	Shelley	
1973	The Way We Were	Carol Ann	
1974	The Great Gatsby	Jordan Baker	
1978	Coma	Nancy Greenly	
1978	Death on the Nile	Linnet Ridgeway	
1979	Moonraker	Dr. Holly Goodhead	
1981	Hart to Hart	Mary Scott / Scottie	TV series, Season 2 (1 episode)
1982	Odyssey	Unnamed	Music video for Tony Powers song
1982–1983	Dallas	Holly Harwood	TV series, Season 6 (22 episodes) and Season 7 (2 episodes)
1984	Raw Courage	Ruth	
1986	Sweet Liberty	Leslie	
1986	Dark Mansions	Jessica Drake	TV movie
1987	Creepshow 2	Annie Lansing (segment "The Hitchhiker")	
1987	Tales from the Hollywood Hills: A Table at Ciro's	Lita Nathan	TV movie
1987	Broadcast News	Jennifer Mack	
1989	Say Anything...	Diane's Mother (uncredited)	
1989	Twister	Virginia	
1990	Burning Bridges	Claire Morgan	TV movie
1990	In the Eye of the Snake	Claire Anzer—Marc's Mother	
1990	Murder, She Wrote	Millie Bingham Stafford	TV series, Season 7 (1 episode)
1991	Veronica Clare		TV series, Seasons 1 and 2 (1 episode each)
1991	Until the End of the World	Elsa Farber	
1991	Diary of a Hitman	Sheila	
1992	Obsessed	Louise	TV movie
1993	In the Heat of the Night	Muriel Gray	TV series, Season 6 (1 episode)
1993	Civil Wars	Alexandra Phelps	TV series, Season 2 (1 episode)
1993	Crossroads	Renee	TV series, Season 1 (1 episode)
1993	Lush Life	Lucy	TV movie
1994	L.A. Law	Camilla Greer	TV series, Season 8 (1 episode)
1995	The Babysitter	Bernice Holsten	
1995	Flipper	Allison Van Rijn	TV series, Season 1 (1 episode)
1996	Curdled	Katrina Brandt	
1996	Wish Upon a Star	Principal Mary Mittermiller	TV movie
1997	Bliss	Eva	
1997	The Nanny	Elaine	TV series, Season 4 (1 episode)
1997	Austin Powers: International Man of Mystery	Steamrolled Henchman's Wife (uncredited)	
1997	Speed 2: Cruise Control	Celeste	
1998	Black Cat Run	Ada Bronnel	
2000	Eventual Wife	Susan's Mother	short
2002	Any Day Now	Judge	TV series, Season 4 (1 episode)
2002	Warning: Parental Advisory	Susan Baker	TV movie
2005	CSI: Crime Scene Investigation	Jillian Stokes	TV series, Season 5 (episode: "Grave Danger")
2006	Kettle of Fish	Jean	
