= Together for Days =

- Film poster
- Directed by: Michael Schultz
- Written by: William B. Branch
- Story by: Lindsay Smith
- Produced by: Robert S. Buchanan
- Starring: Clifton Davis; Lois Chiles
- Cinematography: Donald H. Hudgins
- Edited by: Marshall M. Borden
- Music by: Coleridge-Taylor Perkinson
- Production company: TFD Company Ltd.
- Distributed by: Olas Corporation
- Release date: 1972 (USA)
- Running time: 84 minutes
- Country: United States
- Language: English

Poster bearing the re-release title Black Cream

Together for Days is a 1972 American independent blaxploitation film about a relationship between an African-American man and a Caucasian woman, and the reaction of their friends and family in Atlanta, Georgia. Directed by Michael Schultz, it marked Samuel L. Jackson's film debut. On May 6, 2010, Jackson appeared on The Tonight Show and told the audiences that Jay Leno did not find a copy of the film. Jackson said it had been re-released sometime later under the title Black Cream.

== See also ==
- List of American films of 1972
