= List of Rude Awakening episodes =

The following is an episode list for the American television sitcom Rude Awakening, which ran from August 1, 1998 until February 15, 2001. A total of 55 episodes were produced.

== Series overview ==
| Season | Episodes | Originally released | |
| Season | Episodes | First released | Last released |
|---|---|---|---|
| 1 | 13 | August 1, 1998 | November 7, 1998 |
| 2 | 22 | June 26, 1999 | March 18, 2000 |
| 3 | 20 | June 29, 2000 | February 15, 2001 |

== Episodes ==
=== Season 1 (1998) ===
| No. overall | No. in season | Title | Directed by | Written by | Original release date |
|---|---|---|---|---|---|
| 1 | 1 | "Naked Again" | Alan Myerson | Claudia Lonow | August 1, 1998 |
Actress-turned-writer Billie Frank confronts her problems with her addictions. She finds herself in Addictions Anonymous (AA) (Note: name used on-air for the group, a nod to Alcoholics Anonymous) after a DWI accident and an embarrassing interview on an Entertainment Tonight type TV show.
| 2 | 2 | "Vagina" | Alan Myerson | Claudia Lonow | August 8, 1998 |
Trudy's contemptuous nickname for her pregnant daughter-in-law Tish is revealed. Dave drags Billie along to another AA meeting. Tish offers to help Billie by cleaning her apartment but Billie's tales of her past escapades with a woman alienate Tish.
| 3 | 3 | "Lesbians on the Moon (AKA Three Dykes and You're Out)" | Amanda Bearse | Andrew Nicholls & Darrell Vickers | August 15, 1998 |
Jackie and her new ex-con girlfriend move in with Billie.
| 4 | 4 | "Filling the Wrong Hole" | Robert Berlinger | Pamela Norris | August 22, 1998 |
Billie starts overindulging in coffee, tobacco, and shopping.
| 5 | 5 | "Black and Bitter" | Robert Berlinger | Andrea Abbate | August 29, 1998 |
Billie tries to get out of coffee duty at Addictions Anonymous.
| 6 | 6 | "Hello, This Is Addictions Anonymous" | Alan Myerson | Claudia Lonow | September 5, 1998 |
Billie and Dave work the Addictions Anonymous hotline.
| 7 | 7 | "Don't Fuck the Stripper" | Ellen Gittelsohn | Ritch Shydner | September 12, 1998 |
Billie and Dave's relationship stumbles when Billie finds out Dave is sleeping with a stripper.
| 8 | 8 | "Lucky for Me Her Breast Exploded" | Jonathan Prince | Marc Cherry | September 26, 1998 |
Billie regrets taking the lead role in a movie when the script turns out to have gratuitous nudity. Trudy has an affair with a younger man.
| 9 | 9 | "What Ever Happened to Billie Frank" | Ellen Gittelsohn | Casey Clair | October 3, 1998 |
Billie asks Jackie to go to the birthday party her parents' are throwing her, and Dave plans a surprise party for Billie.
| 10 | 10 | "TV Mom" | Ellen Gittelsohn | Pamela Eells | October 17, 1998 |
Billie visits her TV mom Colleen Woods.
| 11 | 11 | "An Embarrassment of Ritch's" | Amanda Bearse | Julie Brown | October 24, 1998 |
One of Billie's old flings returns, threatening her sobriety.
| 12 | 12 | "The Cheese Stands Alone" | James Hampton | James Vallely | October 31, 1998 |
Billie comes down from an acid trip days before getting her 60 day chip.
| 13 | 13 | "That's Why They Call It Dope" | Jonathan Prince | Claudia Lonow & Andrea Abbate | November 7, 1998 |
Billie accidentally feeds Tish's Christian friends marijuana brownies at her baby shower.

=== Season 2 (1999–2000) ===
| No. overall | No. in season | Title | Directed by | Written by | Original release date |
|---|---|---|---|---|---|
| 14 | 1 | "The Grateful Living" | Ellen Gittelsohn | Claudia Lonow | June 26, 1999 |
Billie and Dave almost relapse after meeting Jackie's mom. Trudy breaks her toe.
| 15 | 2 | "One Birthday at a Time" | Ellen Gittelsohn | Pamela Eells | July 3, 1999 |
Dave gives Jackie an ultimatum after she wakes up from her coma.
| 16 | 3 | "And Now a Word From Our Sponsor" | Robert Berlinger | Andrew Nicholls & Darrell Vickers | July 10, 1999 |
Billie loses her sponsor.
| 17 | 4 | "To Bris or Not to Bris" | Robert Berlinger | Steve Armogida & Jim Armogida | July 17, 1999 |
A surprise bris is planned for Tish's baby, but she doesn't want to get him circumcised.
| 18 | 5 | "The Fix Up" | Ellen Gittelsohn | Dan Signer | July 24, 1999 |
Trudy sets up Billie with another alcoholic former child star. Dave and Jackie fall for the same woman.
| 19 | 6 | "Between a Rock Star and a Hard Place" | Ellen Gittelsohn | Andrew Nicholls & Darrell Vickers | July 31, 1999 |
Billie accidentally breaks a famous musician's anonymity after he comes to an Addictions Anonymous meeting.
| 20 | 7 | "Dude Awakening" | Ellen Gittelsohn | Ron Zimmerman | August 7, 1999 |
Dave sponsors a surfer who soon falls for Billie.
| 21 | 8 | "Powerless Over the What?" | Lillah McCarthy | Claudia Lonow | August 14, 1999 |
Trudy and Dave compete over who gets custody of the Addictions Anonymous meeting.
| 22 | 9 | "Bite Me" | Ellen Gittelsohn | Sally Lapiduss | August 21, 1999 |
Billie and Dave decide to start seeing other people.
| 23 | 10 | "Trude Awakening" | Ellen Gittelsohn | Andrew Nicholls & Darrell Vickers | August 28, 1999 |
Trudy goes to Addictions Anonymous because she thinks Billie talks about her too much at the meetings. Dave goes to jail.
| 24 | 11 | "Bosses, Burglars & Back Street Babes" | J.D. Lobue | Stephen Lloyd | September 4, 1999 |
Billie tries to prove herself to her new boss. Trudy tries to catch her maid stealing. Dave becomes Nobby's sponsor.
| 25 | 12 | "1-900-BIG-SLUT" | Ellen Gittelsohn | Emily Cutler | September 11, 1999 |
Billie starts a phone sex line for extra money. Trudy gets sued by her maid.
| 26 | 13 | "The 35-Year Itch" | J.D. Lobue | Emily Cutler | September 18, 1999 |
Billie needs to make a toast at Max and Trudy's wedding anniversary, even though she knows Trudy is leaving with Martic. Dave performs at an open mic night.
| 27 | 14 | "Bad Will Hunting" | Unknown | Dan Signer | November 27, 1999 |
Billie discovers that her parents' will gives everything to her brother instead of her.
| 28 | 15 | "Abstinence Makes the Heart Grow Fonder" | J.D. Lobue | Pamela Eells | December 4, 1999 |
Billie tries to wait four dates before sleeping with the new man she's seeing.
| 29 | 16 | "Jackie Oh..." | Robert Berlinger | Claudia Lonow & Andrea Abbate | December 11, 1999 |
Billie keeps lying to Sydney. Dave starts a suggestion box at the coffee shop. Jackie has bigger problems.
| 30 | 17 | "Slakula" | Ellen Gittelsohn | Stephen Lloyd & Dan Signer | December 18, 1999 |
After losing a fellow member, Billie gets lost in her work producing a movie with Sydney. Dave goes to Milt's apartment.
| 31 | 18 | "On the Rocks with a Twist of Limey" | Ellen Gittelsohn | Jim Gerkin | February 19, 2000 |
Dave helps Nobby at his first sober concert. Billie and Maureen become each others sponsors.
| 32 | 19 | "Yes Sir, That's My Baby" | Ellen Gittelsohn | Emily Cutler | February 26, 2000 |
Billie takes her nephew to Mike's Bar. Nobby wants Dave to help him stay sober while on tour.
| 33 | 20 | "Star 80 Proof" | Ellen Gittelsohn | Chuck Snyder & John Hunter | March 4, 2000 |
Billie has a chance to act in an Emerald Bluff reunion movie but is pressured into having a drink with a co-star. Dave starts seeing Juanita.
| 34 | 21 | "Full House" | Ellen Gittelsohn | Stephen Lloyd | March 11, 2000 |
Trudy catches Martin cheating on her, and asks Billie for help getting back together with Max. Dave gets too into poker.
| 35 | 22 | "Plastered" | Ellen Gittelsohn | Claudia Lonow & Andrea Abbate | March 18, 2000 |
After a night of drinking, Billie breaks her arm and lies to her friends about it. Dave discovers the truth. Jerry stages an intervention for Billie.

=== Season 3 (2000–2001) ===
| No. overall | No. in season | Title | Directed by | Written by | Original release date |
|---|---|---|---|---|---|
| 36 | 1 | "If I Could See Me Now: Parts 1 & 2" | Timothy Busfield | Claudia Lonow & Andrea Abbate | June 29, 2000 |
| 37 | 2 | "If I Could See Me Now: Parts 1 & 2" | Timothy Busfield | Claudia Lonow & Andrea Abbate | June 29, 2000 |
An unemployed Billie spends all her time drinking and doing cocaine with Maureen while bills pile up. Billie tries to borrow money from friends and family, but no one will agree until she gets help. Marcus's wife kicks him out, and he moves in with Dave. Billie hits rock bottom.
| 38 | 3 | "To Love and To Serve" | J.D. Lobue | Stephen Lloyd | July 6, 2000 |
Billie, now recovering, gets a job with Trudy's lawyer boyfriend. Her first task is to serve Marcus divorce papers.
| 39 | 4 | "Relation-slips" | Ellen Gittelsohn | Andrea Frazer & Herbert C. Goss | July 13, 2000 |
Billie tries to figure out her relationship with Dave. Marcus tries to lose himself in his work after being served divorce papers.
| 40 | 5 | "Truth Don't Fail Me Now" | Ellen Gittelsohn | Chuck Snyder & John Hunter | July 20, 2000 |
Billie wonders if she should tell Dave that she slept with Marcus.
| 41 | 6 | "Me, Myself and I" | Ellen Gittelsohn | Tim Hightower | July 27, 2000 |
Billie and Dave's relationship hits a rough patch after Billie's affair with Marcus is revealed.
| 42 | 7 | "Judging Billie" | William Russ | Pam Veasey | August 3, 2000 |
At jury duty, the other jurors try to get Billie removed. Marcus faces a lawsuit and an assault charge.
| 43 | 8 | "How Was Your Date?" | Matthew Diamond | Claudia Lonow & Andrea Abbate | August 10, 2000 |
Marcus asks Billie out. Dave becomes attracted to Raquel.
| 44 | 9 | "Do the Right Thing" | Ellen Gittelsohn | Chuck Snyder & John Hunter | August 17, 2000 |
Marcus feels excluded from Billie's life, so she invites him to an AA meeting. Billie has a difficult time with her new responsibilities as the AA group secretary.
| 45 | 10 | "The Casting Ouch" | Ellen Gittelsohn | Dan Signer | August 24, 2000 |
Billie learns that Marcus has set up an interview with a prominent director and tries to set up a meeting of her own. Clark wants to hold an AA meeting at Dave's restaurant.
| 46 | 11 | "Three Men and a Womb" | J.D. Lobue | Andrea Frazer & Herbert C. Goss | August 31, 2000 |
Clark and Henry ask Billie to carry their baby, but Marcus doesn't think it's such a good idea. Dave suffers from chronic tiredness since he began dating a female athlete who beats him soundly at every sport they try.
| 47 | 12 | "All's Well That Amends Well" | Jonathan Schmock | Stephen Lloyd | September 7, 2000 |
Dave and Marcus attend a party at the "Perfect 10" mansion without telling Billie and Raquel. Invitationless Billie and Raquel hatch a plan to get even with Dave and Marcus. Nobby Clegg makes amends with a playmate.
| 48 | 13 | "Telltale Heart" | Gordon Hunt | Claudia Lonow & Andrea Abbate | September 14, 2000 |
Trudy enters the hospital for plastic surgery, but the doctor refuses to do the operation because her drink problem has led to a life-threatening heart condition. Martin tells Billie he is leaving Trudy.
| 49 | 14 | "Throw Mama from the Apartment" | Timothy Busfield | Andrea Frazer & Herbert C. Goss | January 4, 2001 |
Trudy moves in with Billie in an effort to adopt a more sober lifestyle. Dave and Marcus shoot a video to send to Raquel in Australia.
| 50 | 15 | "Ode to Billie and Joe" | J.D. Lobue | Shawn Schepps | January 11, 2001 |
Marcus' demanding father visits, not knowing that his son is getting divorced and that he and Billie are dating. Pregnant Haley asks Dave to act as her husband at a college reunion because she doesn't want anyone to know she's a surrogate mother for a gay couple.
| 51 | 16 | "Kiss, Kiss, Kiss..." | Timothy Busfield | Mark Silver | January 18, 2001 |
Billie gets a small role in a new film. She is attracted to her co-star, whom she has to kiss. Dave and Haley share an awkward kiss. Marcus spends the night with Nancy, whose mother has just died.
| 52 | 17 | "Duck" | David Grossman | Stephen Lloyd | January 25, 2001 |
Dave tries to tell Billy that Marcus is involved with Nancy again. Dave first gives the wrong impression when he attempts to warn Billie, but things come to a head when Marcus shows up at his own surprise party with Nancy.
| 53 | 18 | "Blessings and Dead Guys" | David Grossman | Emily Cutler | February 1, 2001 |
Billie goes on a date with movie star Jake Newman, but he dies during the date, and Billie is asked to speak at his funeral service. Dave accidentally proposes to Raquel when she tells him her visa has expired.
| 54 | 19 | "Dawg Daze Afternoon" | Ellen Gittelsohn | Shawn Schepps | February 8, 2001 |
Dave is caught up in a jewelry store robbery with Billie on the day of his bachelor party while shopping for a wedding ring for Raquel. Trudy wakes up in the arms of a handsome man who turns out to be an expensive gigolo.
| 55 | 20 | "Altar Ego" | Ellen Gittelsohn | Claudia Lonow & Andrea Abbate | February 15, 2001 |
Billie tries to stop Dave's wedding. She takes extreme measures to prevent Dave from marrying Raquel, including seeking out a medicine woman to place a curse on the ceremony. Marcus reconciles with Nancy.
