= Philip Sterling =

American actor (1922–1998)

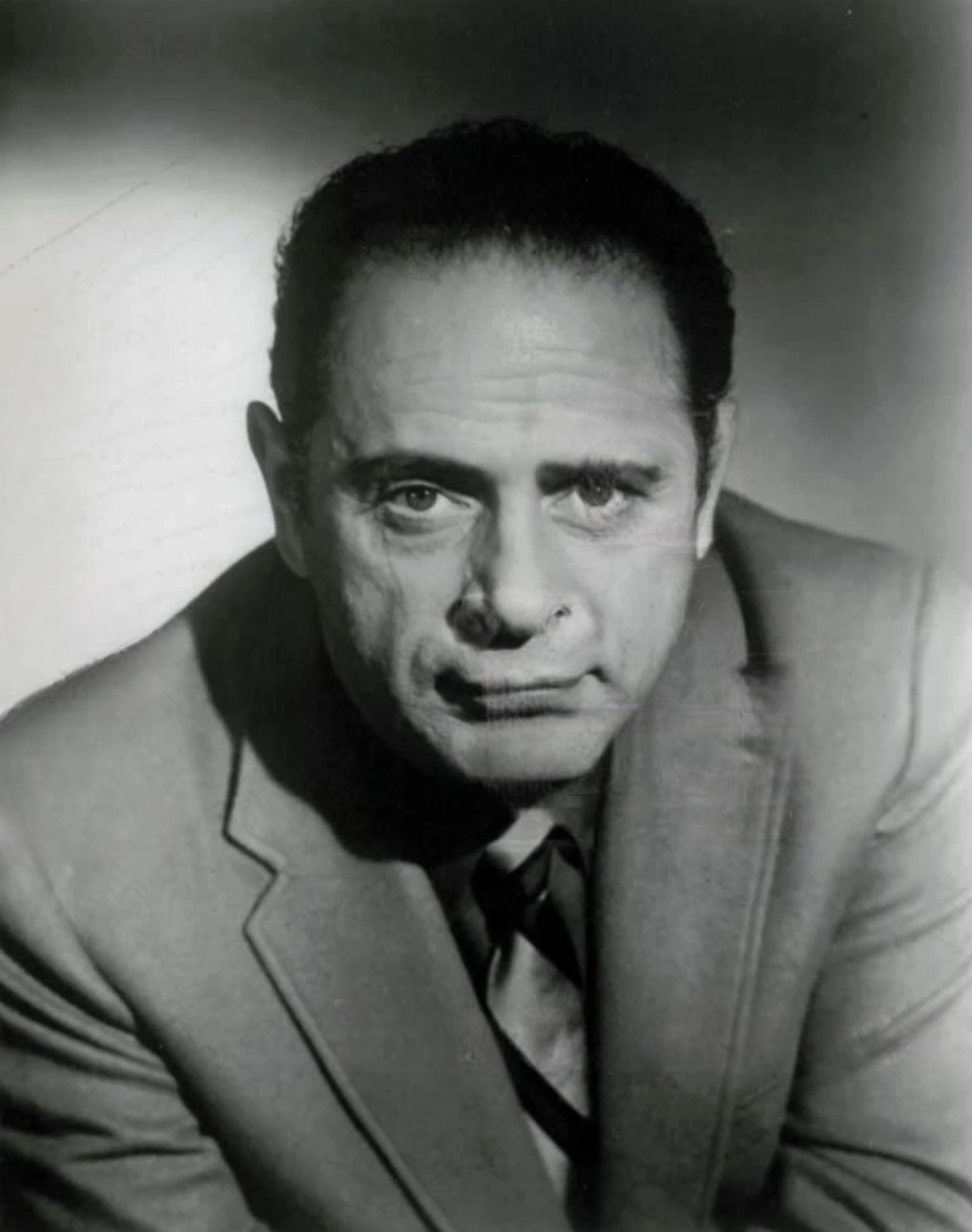
- Sterling in 1970
- Born: October 9, 1922; New York, U.S.
- Died: November 30, 1998 (aged 76); Woodland Hills, Los Angeles, U.S.
- Education: University of Pennsylvania
- Occupation: Actor
- Years active: 1949–1998
- Spouse: Rhona Sterling (m. 1969)

Philip Sterling (October 9, 1922 – November 30, 1998) was an American film and television actor. He played Dr. Winston Croft on 28 episodes of the American daytime soap opera The Doctors. He also played Judge Truman Ventnor on 21 episodes in Sisters and Dr. Simon Weiss on 12 episodes in St. Elsewhere.

Sterling guest-starred in numerous television programs including The Golden Girls, M*A*S*H, The Rockford Files, Family Ties, Hart to Hart, Growing Pains, Night Court, The Wonder Years, The A-Team, Diff'rent Strokes and Newhart. He also appeared in a few episodes of Barney Miller, L.A. Law, Matlock, Guiding Light and Hotel.

== Death ==
Sterling died in November 1998 in Woodland Hills, Los Angeles of complications from myelofibrosis, at the age of 76.

== Filmography ==
=== Film ===
Year	Title	Roles	Notes
1968	The Detective	Reporter	uncredited
1969	Me, Natalie	Mr. Miller	
1971	The Gang That Couldn't Shoot Straight	District Attorney Goodman	
1973	Pueblo	Court of Inquiry Member	TV movie
1974	The Gambler	Sidney	
1975	Hester Street	Mr. Lipman	
1975	First Ladies Diaries: Rachel Jackson	Rachel's Doctor	TV movie
1975	Murder on Flight 502	Benny Cummings	TV movie
1976	Mallory: Circumstantial Evidence	Richmond	TV movie
1976	Victory at Entebbe	Colonel Bar-Lev	TV movie
1977	Audrey Rose	Judge Langley	
1977	The November Plan		TV movie
1978	Dr. Scorpion	Adm. Gunwilder	TV movie
1978	Dr. Strange	Dr. Frank Taylor, Chief of Psychiatry	TV movie
1978	Rainbow	Arthur Freed	TV movie
1978	A Question of Love		TV movie
1978	The Lazarus Syndrome	Septical Doctor	TV movie
1979	Meteor	Russian Representative	
1979	Promises in the Dark	Dr. Frucht	
1980	This Year's Blonde	Dr. Freed	TV movie
1980	The Competition	Mr. Dietrich	
1981	Murder in Texas	Dr. Helpern	TV movie
1981	Born to Be Sold	Sergeant Prill	TV movie
1982	Million Dollar Infield	Harry Ephron	TV movie
1982	The Wall	Reb Mazur	TV movie
1982	Divorce Wars: A Love Story	Max Bernheimer	TV movie
1983	Rita Hayworth: The Love Goddess	Joseph Schenck	TV movie
1984	Best Kept Secrets		TV movie
1985	Tomboy	Earl Delarue	
1985	Movers & Shakers	Other Executive	
1985	The Execution of Raymond Graham	Max Adler	TV movie
1986	Vital Signs	Tommy	TV movie
1986	Killer in the Mirror	Judge Alex W. Kessel	TV movie
1986	Circle of Violence: A Family Drama	Jim McLane	TV movie
1987	Backfire	Dr. Creason	
1988	Nightingales	Sam Steiner	TV movie
1988	Fatal Judgement	Judge Josiah Clay	TV movie
1989	From the Dead of Night	Professor Martin Corning	TV movie
1989	Perry Mason: The Case of the Musical Murder	Mel Singer	TV movie
1990	The Death of the Incredible Hulk	Dr. Ronald Pratt	TV movie
1990	Sisters	Sy Rosen	TV movie
1990	The Long Walk Home	Winston	
1990	A Girl of the Lamberlost	Mr. Henley (Music Teacher)	TV movie
1993	Stone Soup	Old Mike	
1998	My Giant	Uncle Nate	

=== Television ===
Year	Title	Roles	Notes
1949	Studio One in Hollywood	Benny Lewis	1 episode
1949	Hands of Mystery		2 episodes
1949	Kraft Television Theatre		1 episode
1950	Suspense	Ciro	1 episode
1950	Stage 13		1 episode
1950	The Clock		1 episode
1951–1952	Treasury Men in Action		2 episodes
1952	The Big Story	Bernard Beckwith	1 episode
1956	As the World Turns	Rev. George Booth (1976–1979)	unknown episodes
1957	The Kaiser Aluminum Hour		1 episode
1958	Decoy	Sergeant Basilio	1 episode
1958	The Edge of Night	Vic Ratner	1 episode
1958–1959	True Story	Fred Carter/Sandy Sanford	2 episodes
1959	Deadline	Johnson	1 episode
1962–1987	Guiding Light	George Hayes/Kaz Kazolowsi	3 episodes
1962	Naked City	Officer Schulberg/Job Advisor	2 episodes
1970	Somerset	Rafe Carter (1970–1971)	unknown episodes
1970–1971	Another World	Rafe Carter	3 episodes
1973	The Doctors	Dr. Winston Croft	28 episodes
1974	The ABC Afternoon Playbreak	Harry Prosnick	1 episode
1974	The Wide World of Mystery	Jenkins	1 episode
1975	Harry O	Maxie Reardon	1 episode
1975–1982	Barney Miller	Mr. Buckholtz/Noel Cadey/Mitchell Warner/Judge Philip Paul Gibson/Frank Rilling, F.B.I./Howard Spangler	6 episodes
1975	Doctors' Hospital	Dr. Miller	1 episode
1976	City of Angels	Michael Brimm	7 episodes
1976	Switch	Boyle	1 episode
1976	Delvecchio	Bernie Hollan	1 episode
1977	Maude	Detective Bronson	1 episode
1977	Kingston: Confidential	Shiller	1 episode
1977	Rafferty		1 episode
1977	Fish	Roland	1 episode
1977	Family	Victor Harris	1 episode
1978	The Rockford Files	County Supervisor Tom Nardoni	1 episode
1978	Rhoda	Phillip Cooper	1 episode
1979	The White Shadow	Lee Burns	1 episode
1980	Hart to Hart	Dr. Selman	1 episode
1981	It's a Living	John	1 episode
1981	M*A*S*H	Dr. Myron 'Bud' Herzog	1 episode
1981	House Calls		1 episode
1981	Diff'rent Strokes	Conroy	1 episode
1982–1984	Family Ties	Mr. Winkler	2 episodes
1982	Today's F.B.I.	Dr. Harker	1 episode
1982	Remington Steele	John Seward	1 episode
1983	The A-Team	Grant Eldridge	2 episodes
1983–1988	St. Elsewhere	Dr. Simon Weiss	12 episodes
1983	Mr. Smith		1 episode
1983	Emerald Point N.A.S.	Hurley	1 episode
1984	Night Court	Leonard Blum	1 episode
1984	Simon & Simon	Birddog Hansen	1 episode
1984–1989	Newhart	Attorney Nelson/Mr. Grad	2 episodes
1984	Magnum, P.I.	Harry Clayborn	1 episode
1985–1986	Hotel	Sylvester Sullivan/Dr. Greenblatt	2 episodes
1985	The Paper Chase		1 episode
1985	Stir Crazy		1 episode
1986	Growing Pains	Dr. Miller	1 episode
1986–1989	Matlock	Prosecutor/Thomas Freemont/Kenneth Roberts	3 episodes
1986–1987	The Golden Girls	Dr. Barensfeld/Dr. Ashley	2 episodes
1988–1993	L.A. Law	Judge Jonathan Cramer	4 episodes
1988	A Year in the Life	Ned	1 episode
1989	Almost Grown	Mel	1 episode
1989	The Wonder Years	Grandpa Pfeiffer	1 episode
1990	The Hogan Family	Mr. Hayes	1 episode
1990	Anything but Love		1 episode
1990	Murder, She Wrote	Capt. Sam Cohen	1 episode
1990	Thirtysomething	Rabbi Frankel	1 episode
1991–1995	Sisters	Judge Truman Ventnor	21 episodes
1995	NYPD Blue	Albert Bloom	1 episode
1996	Murder One	Frederick Hartman	1 episode
1996	Caroline in the City	Arnie Glickman	1 episode
