= Career (play) =

1956 comedy play by James Lee

- Written by: James Lee
- Original language: English
- Genre: Comedy

Premiere
- Date premiered: August 28, 1956
- Place premiered: Alley Theatre, Houston 1956; The Actors' Playhouse 1957

Career is a 1956 comedy play by James Lee. It was later turned into the 1959 movie Career, also written by Lee.

== Productions ==
The show was dedicated to Margo Jones, and opened on August 28, 1956, at the Alley Theatre, Houston.

After its run in Houston, it ran Off-Broadway at the Seventh Avenue South Playhouse (later renamed the Actor's Playhouse), directed by Charles Olsen, design by David Hays, starring Charles White (Charley Marsalla), Charles Aidman (Sam Lawson), Nancy Rennick (Barbara Neilson), Clifton James (Robert Kensington), Forrest Wood (Assistant/Matt Hemsley), Frances Armstrong (An Actress), Richard Goldhurst (Old Actor), Norman Rose (Maury Novak), Mary James (Shirley Drake), William Long, Jr. (Eric Peters), Norma Crane (Sharon Kensington), Bernard Reed (Pinkie Bonaparte), Dick Stahl (Jack Goldman), and Larry Hagman (A Soldier).

== Reviews ==
Brooks Atkinson, of the New York Times, wrote that it was "fundamentally knowledgeable and discerning...obviously, Mr. Lee knows what he is writing about, the spurious enthusiasm for old friends, the cynicism and squalor, the ruthless competition, the corruption of personal character, the affront to personal dignity."
