= Kristina Wayborn =

Swedish actress (born 1950)

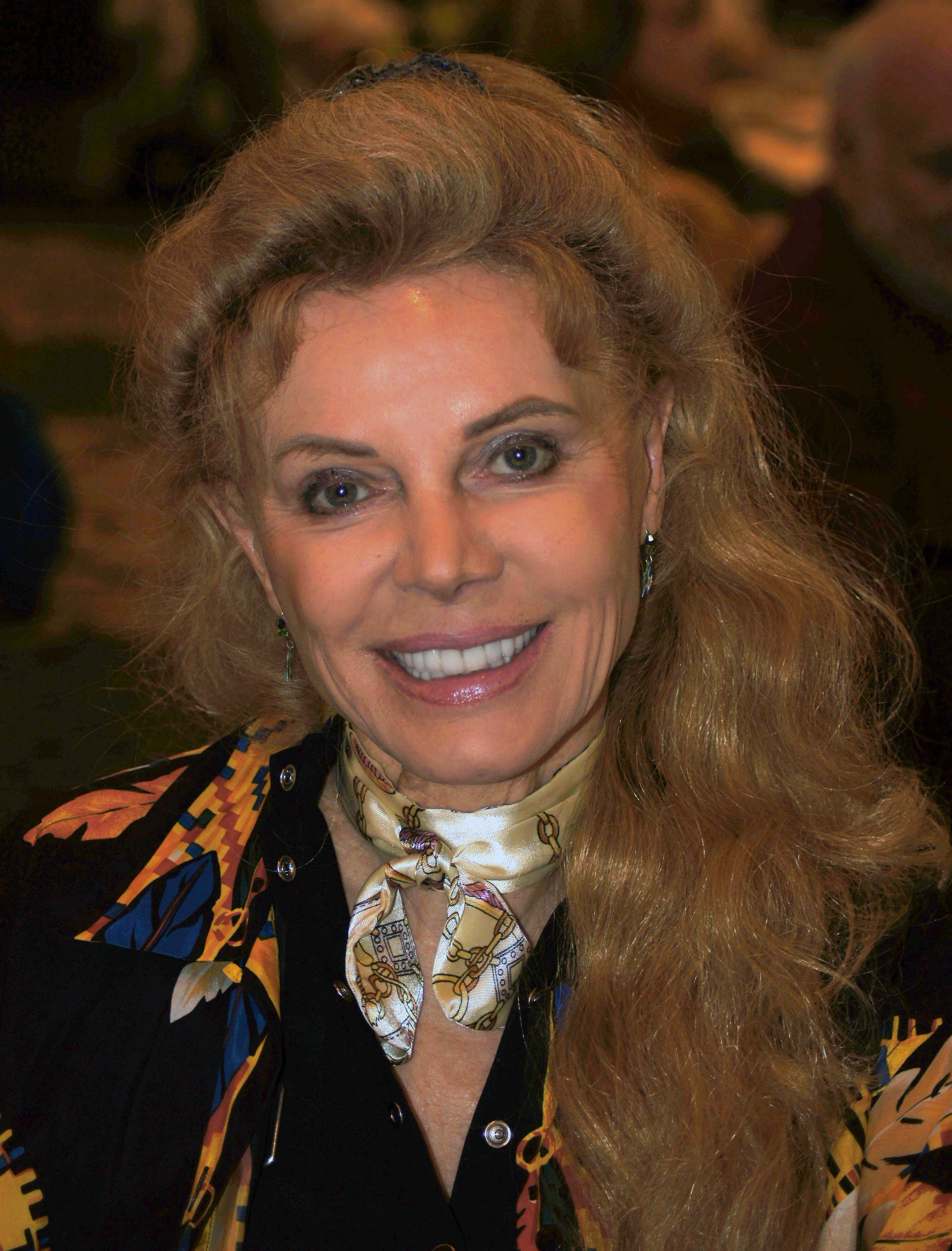
- Kristina Wayborn at the Mid Atlantic Nostalgia Convention in 2023
- Born: Britt-Inger Johansson; 24 September 1950 (age 76); Nybro, Småland, Sweden
- Occupation: Actress
- Years active: 1976–present

Britt-Inger Johansson (born 24 September 1950), known professionally as Kristina Wayborn, is a Swedish actress and beauty pageant titleholder who worked mostly in the United Kingdom and the United States.

== Biography ==
Wayborn was born Britt-Inger Johansson in Nybro, Småland, Sweden. She was Miss Sweden 1970, and was a semi-finalist in the Miss Universe 1970 pageant. She was also selected as Miss Scandinavia 1971.

Wayborn portrayed screen legend Greta Garbo in the television movie The Silent Lovers (1980), an episode of the miniseries Moviola, which brought her to the attention of the producers of the James Bond films.

She was then cast in probably her best known role as Magda in Octopussy (1983) which features a scene in which Magda defeats several of villain Kamal Khan's guards. During filming of this scene, an accident occurred and Wayborn suffered several broken toes.

She subsequently appeared in episodes of American television series including The Love Boat, Airwolf, MacGyver, Dallas, General Hospital, Designing Women, Baywatch and That '70s Show, which reunited her with her Octopussy co-star Maud Adams, and other Bond girls Barbara Carrera and Tanya Roberts.

== Filmography ==
- Victory at Entebbe (1976) (TV) as Claudine
- The Silent Lovers (1980) (TV) as Greta Garbo
- Octopussy (1983) as Magda
- Hostage Flight (1985) (TV) as Ilsa Beck
- The Love Boat (2 episodes, 1982 and 1986) as Anna Petrovska / Monique Ellis
- Airwolf (1 episode 1986 "The Girl Who Fell From the Sky") as Dawn Harrison
- MacGyver (1 episode, 1986 "The Escape") as Sara Ashford
- Dallas (1 episode, 1986) as Trish
- General Hospital (56 episodes, 1987) as Dr. Greta Ingstrom
- Designing Women (1 episode, 1991) as Gail
- Dangerous Curves (1 episode, 1992) as Norma Desmond
- Little Ghost (1997) as Christine
- Baywatch (2 episodes, 1993 and 1999) as Lena / Lila Franks
- That '70s Show (1 episode, 2000) as Honor
- Forbidden Warrior (2005) as Sorceress
- The Prometheus Project (2010) as Elizabeth's Mother
- Warning: No Trespassing (2018) as Krissy
- Americana (2022) as Donna
