= Pleasure Cove =

- Genre: Comedy; Drama
- Written by: Lou Shaw
- Directed by: Bruce Bilson
- Starring: Tom Jones; Constance Forslund; Melody Anderson
- Music by: Perry Botkin Jr.
- Country of origin: United States
- Original language: English

Production
- Executive producer: David Gerber
- Producer: Mel Swope
- Production location: Santa Barbara, California
- Cinematography: Jack Whitman
- Editors: John Farrell; J. Terry Williams
- Running time: 100 minutes
- Production companies: Columbia Pictures Television; David Gerber Productions; Lou Shaw Productions

Original release
- Network: NBC
- Release: January 3, 1979

Pleasure Cove is a 1979 television film directed by Bruce Bilson and starring singer Tom Jones in his acting debut alongside Constance Forslund, Melody Anderson, Jerry Lacy, David Hasselhoff and Tanya Roberts. The film was intended to be a pilot for a potential television series to cash in on the popularity of series like Fantasy Island and Love Boat but was not picked up. It aired on NBC on January 3, 1979.

== Plot ==
The film follows the lives of staff and guests in a holiday island resort named Pleasure Cove. Raymond Gordon (Tom Jones) is a suave conman hiding in disguise at the resort run by manager Kim Parker (Constance Forslund) with whom he falls in love.

== Cast ==
- Tom Jones as Raymond Gordon
- Constance Forslund as Kim Parker
- Melody Anderson as Julie
- Jerry Lacy as Chip Garvery
- Joan Hackett as Martha Harrison
- Harry Guardino as Bert Harrison
- Shelley Fabares as Helen
- David Hasselhoff as Scott
- Tanya Roberts as Sally
- Barbara Luna as Gail Tyler
- Ron Masak as Joe
