= The Scarlett O'Hara War =

1980 television film by John Erman

- Print ad
- Genre: Drama
- Based on: Moviola by Garson Kanin
- Teleplay by: William Hanley
- Directed by: John Erman
- Starring: Tony Curtis; Bill Macy; Harold Gould
- Theme music composer: Walter Scharf
- Country of origin: United States
- Original language: English

Production
- Producer: Jacqueline Babbin
- Cinematography: Gayne Rescher
- Editor: Richard Bracken
- Running time: 98 minutes
- Production companies: David Wolper-Stan Margulies Productions (in association with); Warner Bros. Television

Original release
- Network: NBC
- Release: May 19, 1980

The Scarlett O'Hara War is a 1980 American made-for-television drama film directed by John Erman. It is based on the 1979 novel Moviola by Garson Kanin. Set in late 1930s Hollywood, it is about the search for the actress to play Scarlett O'Hara in the much anticipated film adaptation of Gone with the Wind (1939). This film premiered as the finale of a three-night TV miniseries on NBC called Moviola: A Hollywood Saga.

== Plot ==
Margaret Mitchell's novel Gone with the Wind is published in 1936 and is an instant nationwide sensation. The movie rights are up for grabs, and every studio in Hollywood wants it. While having lunch at the MGM dining room, Louis B. Mayer is talking to his son-in-law David O. Selznick about the film rights. In time, Selznick establishes his own production company, Selznick International Pictures, and wants his studio to have a film that will cement both its fame and his.

Back at MGM, Joan Crawford is negotiating the idea of her portraying the acclaimed heroine, even getting Selznick to come back to her place to spend the night to "seal the deal." However, other actresses must be tested in order to expand possibilities. One of the first to do this is Paulette Goddard and her screen test is the most praised out of them all. Tallulah Bankhead comes down from New York City and auditions for the role and although she herself is a Southerner who could easily play the part, Selznick decides to give her more tests and seek other candidates. But when Louella Parsons gets wind of this, she misinforms her radio audience that Tallulah has gotten the part, thanks to the influential power of her father William Brockman Bankhead, who at the time was the Speaker of the U.S. House of Representatives. When this is announced, Joan Crawford throws her radio at a mirror and Paulette makes a beeline to the study of her lover, Charlie Chaplin, announcing that Tallulah has gotten the part.

After this error has been cleared and the actresses have been reassured that the role is still up for grabs, the casting process continues. One day while Clark Gable and Myron Selznick are hunting, Gable mentions that he is being considered for the role of Rhett Butler. Fleming agrees that Gable would be an appropriate choice but Gable is uncertain about accepting the role because the film is to be directed by George Cukor, often considered "a woman's director". Gable first tries to withdraw from the very idea but later goes forth with the role after Louis B. Mayer threatens him with a suspension. It isn't long before Gable's love interest Carole Lombard is considered for the part.

One night at the Selznick lot, a party is thrown to honor the actresses who are closest to winning the role of Scarlett and entertaining such stars as Joan Bennett, Margaret Sullavan, Jean Arthur, and Miriam Hopkins. Tallulah Bankhead is there, too, sitting at the table saying to herself, "Oh God, when will it ever stop?". While at this party, George Cukor is talking with the actresses, seeing if they would be interested to star in his upcoming film The Women after Gone With The Wind is filmed. When Cukor asks Bankhead if she would entertain appearing in The Women, her response is one of disbelief - why would any actress appear in a movie with "No men ... at all?" When it comes time to have dinner at the party, Tallulah and Carole, who are sitting with Selznick between them, decide to get back at the producer for putting them through this acting contest. They stand up to make an announcement, pour their soup bowls onto his head, and declare, "Frankly my dear we don't give a damn". Laughter ensues.

Later in 1938 Selznick has still not decided who he'll have as his Scarlett after Paulette Goddard is denied the part for failing to verify whether she is married to Charlie Chaplin. As the burning of Atlanta scene is to begin for a test sequence, his brother Myron Selznick arrives with a new actress. When he directs Selznick to look at her, David first refuses but after more badgering finally submits. When the young actress removes her hat, he sees the beautiful Vivien Leigh and informs her that she is his Scarlett. The rest is film history.

== Cast ==
- Tony Curtis as David O. Selznick
- Bill Macy as Myron Selznick
- Harold Gould as Louis B. Mayer
- Sharon Gless as Carole Lombard
- George Furth as George Cukor
- Edward Winter as Clark Gable
- Barrie Youngfellow as Joan Crawford
- Carrie Nye as Tallulah Bankhead
- Clive Revill as Charlie Chaplin
- Gwen Humble as Paulette Goddard
- Patricia Smith as Louise Knight
- James Ray as Tom Adams
- William Borgert as Russell Birdwell
- Sue Ann Gilfillan as Kay Brown
- Joey Forman as Walter Winchell
- Jane Kean as Louella Parsons
- Jean Gilpin as Margeret Sullivan
- Sam Weisman as Page
- Kenneth Kimmins as Fuller
- Melody Thomas Scott as Laurie Lee (as Melody Thomas)
- Elisabeth Fraser as Atlanta Lady
- Warren Munson as Bill Menzies
- Howard George as Max Arnow
- Merle Ann Taylor as Katharine Hepburn (as Merleann Taylor)
- Gypsi DeYoung as Lucille Ball
- Jo McDonnell as Isobel
- Don Keefer as Judge
- Michael Hewitson as Ashley
- DeeDee Rescher as Phoebe (as DeeDee Rescher)
- Gaye Kruger as Lorraine
- Vicki Belmonte as Jean Arthur
- Sheilah Wells as Miriam Hopkins
- Jessica St. John as Secretary
- Maurice Hill as Richard Walsh
- Dan Caldwell as Sidney Howard
- Paul Kreppel as Delivery Man
- Morgan Brittany as Vivien Leigh

== Reception, filming locations, and additional details ==
At the 1980 Emmy Awards, The Scarlett O'Hara War won two awards for make-up by Richard Blair and costume design by Travilla. It was nominated in five additional categories; Outstanding Director in a Limited Series or Special, Outstanding Lead Actor in a Limited Series or Special (Tony Curtis), Outstanding Limited Series, Outstanding Supporting Actor in a Limited Series (Harold Gould), and Outstanding Actress in a Limited Series (Carrie Nye). At the Golden Globe Awards in 1981 the movie was nominated for Best TV Series in the Drama category.

A large percent of the studio scenes were filmed on Stages 12 and 19 at the Warner Bros. Burbank Studios in Burbank, California. The film was the finale of a 3-part 1980 TV miniseries called Moviola: A Hollywood Saga. Part 1 was The Silent Lovers, which focused on the ill-fated relationship of Greta Garbo and John Gilbert. Part 2 was This Year's Blonde, about Marilyn Monroe. The distribution company for the film was by Warner Bros. Television.

This was the third time Morgan Brittany portrayed Vivien Leigh; she had previously played Leigh in Gable and Lombard (1976), a biopic of Clark Gable and Carole Lombard. Prior to that, she had an uncredited cameo appearance in the film, The Day of the Locust (1975). Also, actress Annie Potts, of Designing Women fame, has a small, uncredited role as a starlet who auditions for the role of Scarlett.

The complete film is one of the bonus features on the Blu-ray Bonus disc (disc 2) included with the 70th Anniversary Limited Edition of Gone With the Wind from Warner Home Video.

== See also ==
- Moviola, 1979 novel by Garson Kanin, source material for this film
- This Year's Blonde (1980), the second installment of TV miniseries Moviola: A Hollywood Saga
