= Octopussy =

1983 James Bond film by John Glen

- British theatrical release poster by Dan Goozee and Renato Casaro
- Directed by: John Glen
- Screenplay by: George MacDonald Fraser; Richard Maibaum; Michael G. Wilson
- Based on: James Bond by Ian Fleming
- Produced by: Albert R. Broccoli
- Starring: Roger Moore; Maud Adams; Louis Jourdan; Kristina Wayborn; Kabir Bedi
- Cinematography: Alan Hume
- Edited by: Peter Davies; Henry Richardson
- Music by: John Barry
- Production companies: Eon Productions; United Artists
- Distributed by: MGM/UA Entertainment Co. (United States); United International Pictures (International)
- Release dates: 6 June 1983 (United Kingdom); 10 June 1983 (United States)
- Running time: 131 minutes
- Countries: United Kingdom; United States
- Languages: English; Russian; German; Spanish; Hindi
- Budget: $27.5 million
- Box office: $187.5 million

Octopussy is a 1983 spy film and the thirteenth in the James Bond series produced by Eon Productions. It is the sixth to star Roger Moore as the MI6 agent James Bond and the second to be directed by John Glen. The screenplay was written by George MacDonald Fraser, Richard Maibaum and Michael G. Wilson.

The film's title is taken from a short story in Ian Fleming's 1966 short story collection Octopussy and The Living Daylights. Although the events of the "Octopussy" short story form part of the title character's background, the film's plot is mostly original. It does, however, contain a scene adapted from the Fleming short story "The Property of a Lady" (included in 1967 and later editions of Octopussy and The Living Daylights)

In Octopussy, Bond is assigned the task of hunting a megalomaniacal Soviet general (Steven Berkoff) who is stealing jewellery and art objects from the Kremlin art repository. This leads Bond to the exiled Afghan prince Kamal Khan (Louis Jourdan), and his associate Octopussy (Maud Adams), and the discovery of a plot to force disarmament in Western Europe with the use of a nuclear weapon.

Octopussy was the first Bond film released by Metro-Goldwyn-Mayer, which had absorbed United Artists, the previous distributor of Eon Bond films. It was produced by Albert R. Broccoli and executive-produced by Michael G. Wilson; it was released four months before the non-Eon Bond film Never Say Never Again. The film earned $187.5 million against its $27.5 million budget and received mixed reviews. Praise was directed towards the action sequences and locations, with the plot and humour being targeted for criticism; Adams's portrayal of the titular character also drew mixed responses.

Octopussy was followed by A View to a Kill in 1985.

== Plot ==
After an encounter with knife-throwing twin assassins Mischka and Grishka in East Berlin, mortally wounded British agent 009, dressed as a circus clown and carrying a fake Fabergé egg, crashes into the British ambassador's residence and dies. MI6 suspects Soviet involvement and, after the real egg is to be auctioned in London, sends James Bond to identify the seller.

At the auction, Bond switches the fake egg for the real one and engages in a bidding war with exiled Afghan prince Kamal Khan, forcing him to pay £500,000 for it. Bond follows Khan to his palace in India and defeats him in a game of backgammon using Khan's loaded dice. Bond and his MI6 contact, Vijay, escape Khan's bodyguard Gobinda in a taxi chase through a marketplace. Later, Khan's associate Magda seduces Bond who allows her to steal the real egg, which is fitted with Q's listening and tracking device. Gobinda knocks Bond unconscious and takes him to Khan's palace. After Bond escapes, he listens in on the bug and discovers that Khan works with Orlov, a corrupt Soviet general seeking to defy his superiors and expand Soviet domination to Western Europe. Orlov has been supplying Khan with priceless Soviet treasures stolen from the Kremlin, replacing them with fakes while Khan has been smuggling the real objects into the West using a circus troupe belonging to a mysterious woman named Octopussy.

Bond infiltrates a floating palace in Udaipur and meets Octopussy, a businesswoman, smuggler and Khan's associate. She also leads the Octopus cult, which Magda is a member of. Octopussy has a personal connection with Bond: her father was the late Major Dexter-Smythe, whom Bond arrested for treason. Octopussy thanks Bond for allowing the Major to commit suicide rather than face trial, and invites him to be her guest. Khan's assassins break into the palace to kill Bond, but he and Octopussy defeat them. Bond learns from Q that the assassins have killed Vijay.

Orlov is planning to meet Khan in Karl-Marx-Stadt, East Germany, where the circus is scheduled to perform, whilst in Moscow General Gogol begins to pursue Orlov when the fake jewels are discovered. Travelling to East Germany, Bond infiltrates the circus and discovers that Orlov has replaced the jewels with a nuclear warhead, primed to explode during the circus performance at a United States Air Force base in West Germany. The explosion would cause Europe to seek unilateral disarmament in the belief that the bomb belonged to the US and was detonated at the airbase accidentally, which would leave the unprotected borders open to a Soviet invasion.

Bond drives Orlov's car along the railway tracks and boards the circus train. Orlov gives chase, but is killed by border guards when he tries to catch the train as it crosses the border. Bond kills Mischka and Grischka to avenge the murder of 009 and, after falling from the train, hitch-hikes a lift from a passing motorist to reach the airbase, eventually stealing a car from a nearby town to complete his journey. Bond penetrates the base and disguises himself as a clown to evade the West German police. He convinces Octopussy that Khan has betrayed her and, realizing that she has been tricked, she assists him in deactivating the warhead.

With the plan stopped, Khan has returned to his palace and prepares to flee. Bond and Octopussy also return separately to India. Bond arrives at Khan's palace just as Octopussy and her troops launch an assault on the grounds. Octopussy attempts to kill Khan, but is captured by Gobinda. While Octopussy's team overpowers Khan's guards, Khan and Gobinda abandon the palace, taking Octopussy as a hostage. As they attempt to escape in their plane, Bond clings to the fuselage and disables an engine and the elevator panel. Struggling with Bond, Gobinda falls to his death, and Bond and Octopussy jump off the plane onto a nearby cliff seconds before it crashes, killing Khan. While the Minister of Defence and Gogol discuss the return of the stolen jewels to the Kremlin, Bond recuperates with Octopussy aboard her private galley in India.

== Cast ==
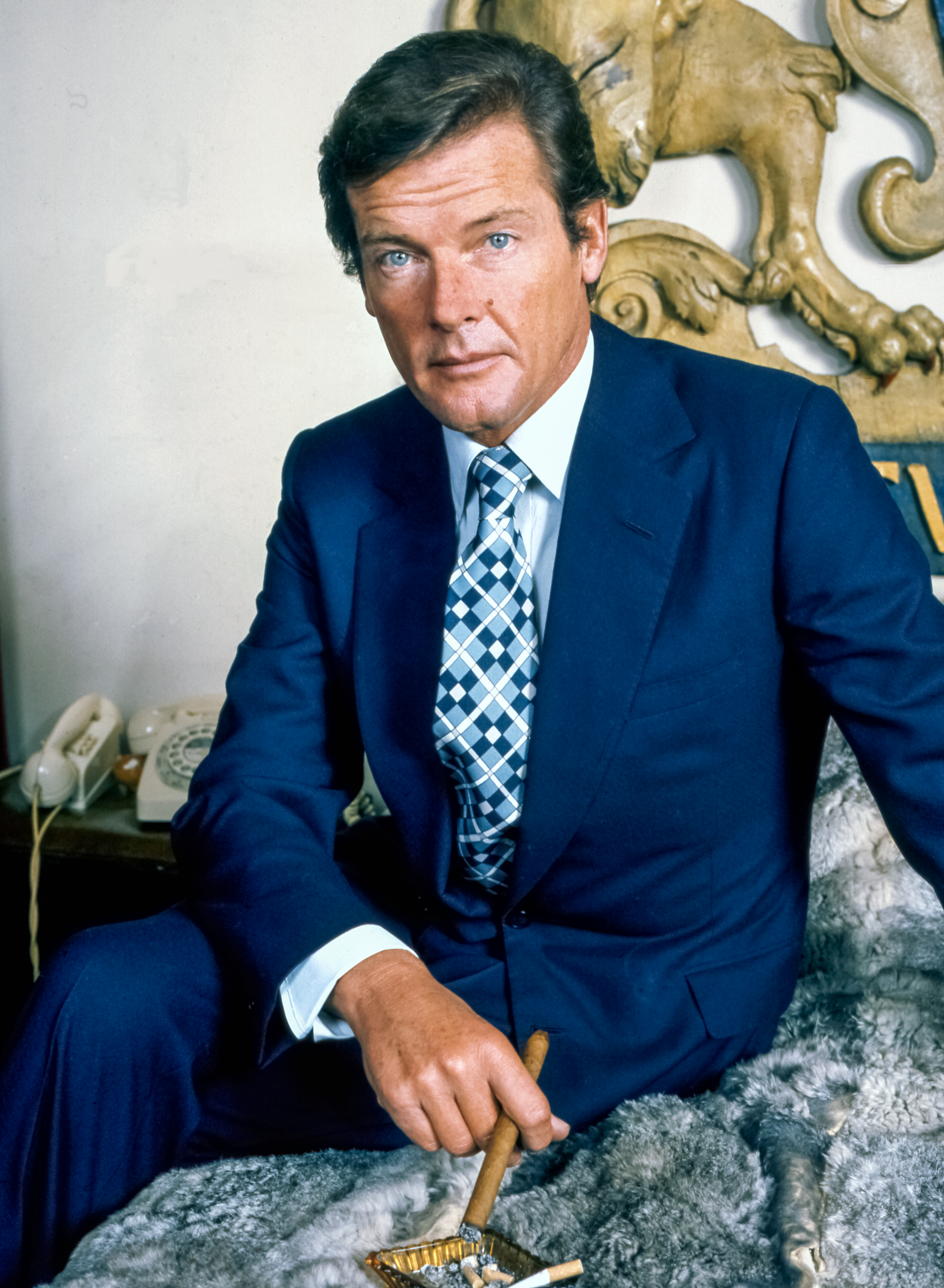
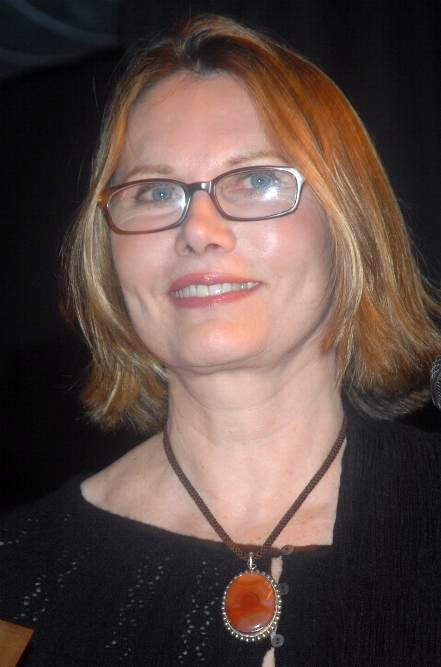
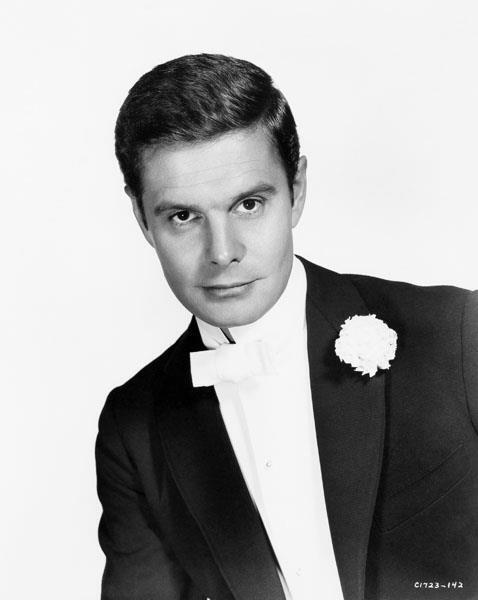
Roger Moore (left) in 1973, Maud Adams (middle) in 2008 and Louis Jourdan in 1958
- Roger Moore as James Bond, MI6 agent 007.
- Maud Adams as Octopussy, a jewel smuggler and wealthy businesswoman. Adams previously played Andrea Anders in The Man With the Golden Gun.
- Louis Jourdan as Kamal Khan, an exiled Afghan prince.
- Kristina Wayborn as Magda, trusted subordinate and henchwoman to Octopussy and Khan.
- Kabir Bedi as Gobinda, Khan's powerful bodyguard.
- Steven Berkoff as General Orlov, a renegade Soviet general who works with Khan to bomb a US airbase, and destabilise NATO.
- Vijay Amritraj as Vijay, Bond's MI6 ally in India. This was Amritraj's acting debut after gaining prominence as a tennis player.
- David Meyer and Anthony Meyer as Mischka and Grischka (credited as Twin One and Twin Two): Orlov's knife-throwing henchmen who are performers in Octopussy's circus.
- Douglas Wilmer as Jim Fanning, antiquities expert who accompanies Bond at the Fabergé auction.
- Robert Brown as M, head of the Secret Intelligence Service and Bond's superior.
- Walter Gotell as General Anatoly Gogol, director of the KGB.
- Desmond Llewelyn as Q, MI6's gadget designer. Llewelyn was disappointed that he was unable to travel to India since his scenes were filmed at Pinewood Studios.
- Lois Maxwell as Miss Moneypenny, M's secretary.
- Geoffrey Keen as British Minister of Defence Frederick Gray (credited as Minister of Defence).
- Albert Moses as Sadruddin, head of MI6 station in India, assigned to assist Bond.
- Bruce Boa as U.S. Air Force General Peterson, the American base commander in West Germany.
- Michaela Clavell as Penelope Smallbone, Moneypenny's assistant.
- Paul Hardwick as the Soviet Chairman who presides over the meeting between Orlov and Gogol. Hardwick was cast due to his resemblance to Soviet General Secretary Leonid Brezhnev, but Brezhnev died during production in November 1982, making his presence an anachronism. This was Hardwick's final film role, as he himself died in October 1983, four months after the film's release.

Other actors in smaller roles include Andy Bradford as MI6 agent 009, Dermot Crowley as Lieutenant Kamp, Orlov's nuclear weapons expert; former Pan's People dancer Cherry Gillespie as Midge, an Octopussy subordinate; Peter Porteous as Lenkin, the Kremlin art expert; Eva Rueber-Staier as Rublevitch, Gogol's secretary; Jeremy Bulloch as Smithers, Q's assistant; Richard LeParmentier as General Peterson's aide; Sneh Gupta as the hotel concierge; and Gabor Vernon as Borchoi. Ingrid Pitt has an uncredited voice cameo as Octopussy's galley mistress. Former beauty queens Mary Stävin, Miss World 1977 and Carolyn Seaward Miss United Kingdom 1979, had non speaking roles as two of Octopussy's all female troupe.

== Production ==
=== Writing ===
Despite financial problems at United Artists after the release of Michael Cimino's Heaven's Gate, the studio greenlit another James Bond film to be produced and released in 1983. In May 1981, one month after the announcement, UA was purchased and merged into Metro-Goldwyn-Mayer. Michael G. Wilson, Richard Maibaum, and George MacDonald Fraser were hired to write a film based on short stories from Ian Fleming's posthumous collection Octopussy and The Living Daylights. Fraser later said his work on an unfilmed script of James Clavell's Tai Pan led to his hiring.

Little of the plot of the short story "Octopussy" is used, however, with its events simply related by Bond as the family backstory for one of the main characters. The scene at Sotheby's is, though, adapted from the short story "The Property of a Lady" (included in 1967 and later editions of the collection), while Kamal Khan's reaction following the backgammon game is taken from Fleming's novel Moonraker. After initially intending the film to be set in Japan, Fraser chose India as the setting because of his extensive research on the country for his novel Flashman.

Fraser was hired to work on an early draft of the script and he proposed that the story be set in India, as the series had not yet visited said country. The first draft was delivered shortly after the release of For Your Eyes Only, whose writers Michael G. Wilson and Richard Maibaum went on to rework the script. They discarded his idea for the opening sequence, featuring a motorbike chase set at the Isle of Man TT, but still retained moments that producer Albert R. Broccoli had first criticized, where Bond dressed as a gorilla and later, a clown. The film was rewritten to focus on jewellery smuggling after a scandal in the Soviet Union involving General Secretary Leonid Brezhnev's son-in-law in which the Moscow State Circus was being used to smuggle jewellery.

=== Casting ===
James Brolin's screen test as James Bond, with Vijay Amritraj

Following For Your Eyes Only, Roger Moore had expressed a desire to retire from the role of James Bond. His original contract had been for three films (Live and Let Die in 1973, The Man with the Golden Gun in 1974 and The Spy Who Loved Me in 1977) which was fulfilled. Moore's following two films (Moonraker in 1979 and For Your Eyes Only in 1981) were negotiated on a film-by-film basis. Given his reluctance to return for Octopussy, the producers engaged in a semi-public quest for the next Bond, with Timothy Dalton and Lewis Collins being suggested as a replacement and screen tests carried out with Michael Billington, Oliver Tobias, and American actor James Brolin. However, when rival Bond production Never Say Never Again was announced with former Bond Sean Connery playing Bond, the producers persuaded Moore to continue in the role as it was thought the established actor would fare better against Connery. Brolin stated that he had actually been hired and was on the point of moving to London to begin work on Octopussy until Moore changed his mind and returned, while Broccoli refused to dispute Tobias's public statements that he was about to be cast as Bond.

Sybil Danning was announced in Prevue magazine in 1982 as being Octopussy, but was never actually cast, later explaining that Albert R. Broccoli felt "her personality was too strong". Faye Dunaway was deemed too expensive. Barbara Carrera said she turned down the role in order to appear as Fatima Blush in the competing Bond film Never Say Never Again. Octopussy casting director Jane Jenkins revealed that the Bond producers told her that they wanted a South Asian actress to play Octopussy, so she considered the only two Indians in predominantly white Hollywood, Persis Khambatta and Susie Coelho. Afterward, she auditioned white actresses, like Barbara Parkins and Kathleen Turner, who she felt could pass for Indian. Finally, Broccoli announced to her that Octopussy would be portrayed by Swedish-born Maud Adams, who had been a Bond girl in The Man with the Golden Gun (1974), and had been recently used by Eon to screen test the potential Bonds. To acknowledge the nationality, Adams had her hair darkened, and a few lines were added about how she was raised by an Indian family. A different plotline, with Adams's British father exposed as a traitor, was used instead. The role of Magda went to another Swedish actress, Kristina Wayborn, who gained the attention of producers with her portrayal of Greta Garbo in the TV miniseries The Silent Lovers. Pam Grier turned down an offer to play a Bond girl in the film.

Octopussy is also the first film to feature Robert Brown as M, following the death of Bernard Lee in 1981. Brown was recommended by Moore, who had known him since both worked in the series Ivanhoe. Brown had previously played Admiral Hargreaves in The Spy Who Loved Me, six years earlier.

The first actor to be cast in the film was Vijay Amritraj, a popular Indian professional tennis player whom Broccoli met while watching The Championships in Wimbledon. His character of Bond's ally in India was also named Vijay and used a tennis racket as a weapon. For the villains, Broccoli brought in his friend Louis Jourdan as Kamal Khan, while his daughter Barbara suggested Steven Berkoff for Orlov after having seen him perform his own play, Greek, in Los Angeles.

=== Filming ===
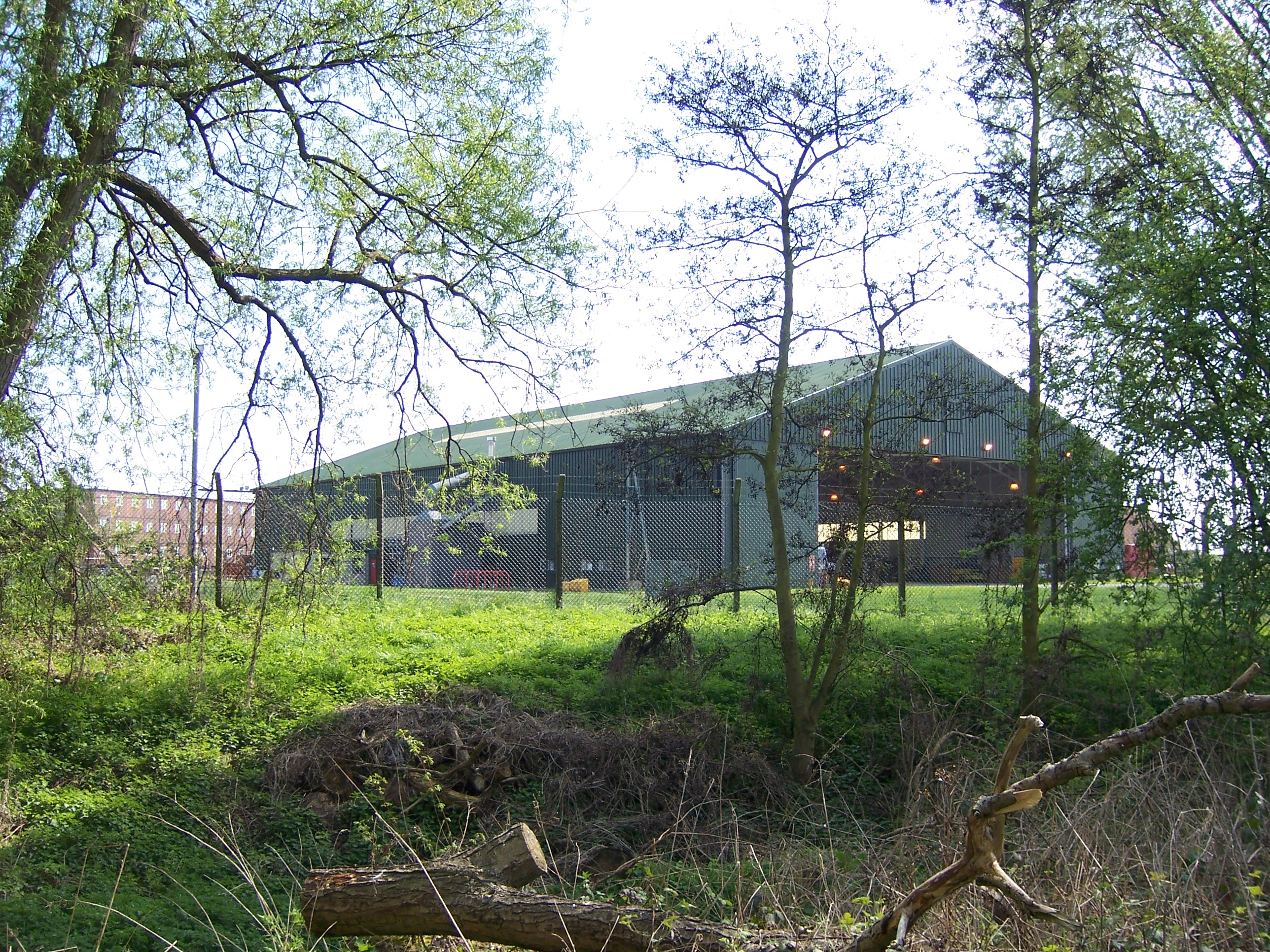
The 311 hangar at RAF Northolt used for filming the jet stunt scene

The filming of Octopussy began in West Berlin on 10 August 1982 with the scene in which Bond arrives at Checkpoint Charlie. Other locations from the city included Spandau Prison, the Brandenburg Gate, and Potsdamer Platz. Principal photography was done by Arthur Wooster and his second unit, who later filmed the knife-throwing scenes. Filming in India began on 12 September 1982 in Udaipur, Rajasthan. The Monsoon Palace served as the exterior of Kamal Khan's palace, while scenes set at Octopussy's palace were filmed at the Lake Palace and Jag Mandir, and Bond's hotel was the Shiv Niwas Palace. In England RAF Northolt, RAF Upper Heyford and RAF Oakley were the main locations. The Karl-Marx-Stadt railways scenes were shot at the Nene Valley Railway in Peterborough, while studio work was performed at Pinewood Studios and the 007 Stage. Parts of the film were also shot in Hurricane Mesa, Hurricane-LaVerkin Bridge, and New Harmony in Utah. Most of the crew, as well as Roger Moore, had diet problems while shooting in India.

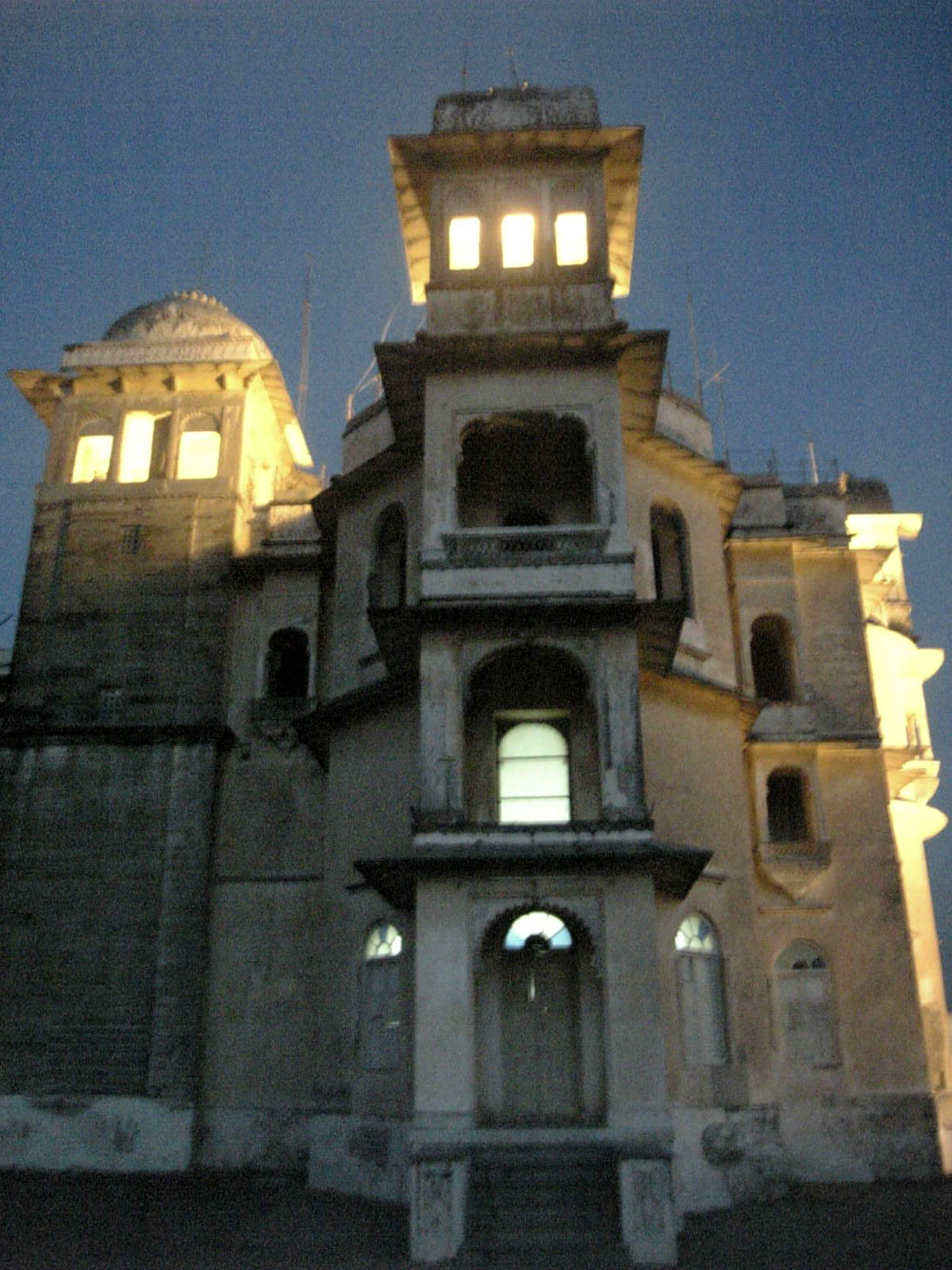
The Monsoon Palace

The pre-title sequence has a scene where Bond flies a nimble homebuilt Bede BD-5J aircraft through an open hangar. Hollywood stunt pilot and aerial co-ordinator J. W. "Corkey" Fornof, who piloted the aircraft at more than 150 miles per hour (240 km/h), has said, "Today, few directors would consider such a stunt. They'd just whip it up in a computer lab." Having collapsible wings, the plane was shown hidden in a horse trailer; however, a dummy was used for this shot. Filming inside the hangar was achieved by attaching the aircraft to an old Jaguar car with a steel pole, driving with the roof removed. The second unit were able to add enough obstacles including people and objects inside the hangar to hide the car and the pole and make it look as though Moore was flying inside the base. For the explosion after the mini jet escapes, however, a miniature of the hangar was constructed and filmed up close. The exploding pieces of the hangar were in reality only four inches (10 cm) long.

Much later in the film, Bond steals Orlov's Mercedes-Benz at a depot defended by antagonist soldiers; as he tries to escape, he drives over barrier spikes shredding the tyres and then manoeuvres the car's bare wheels onto the rails to pursue Octopussy's circus train. During filming, the car had intact tyres in one scene so as to avoid any mishap.

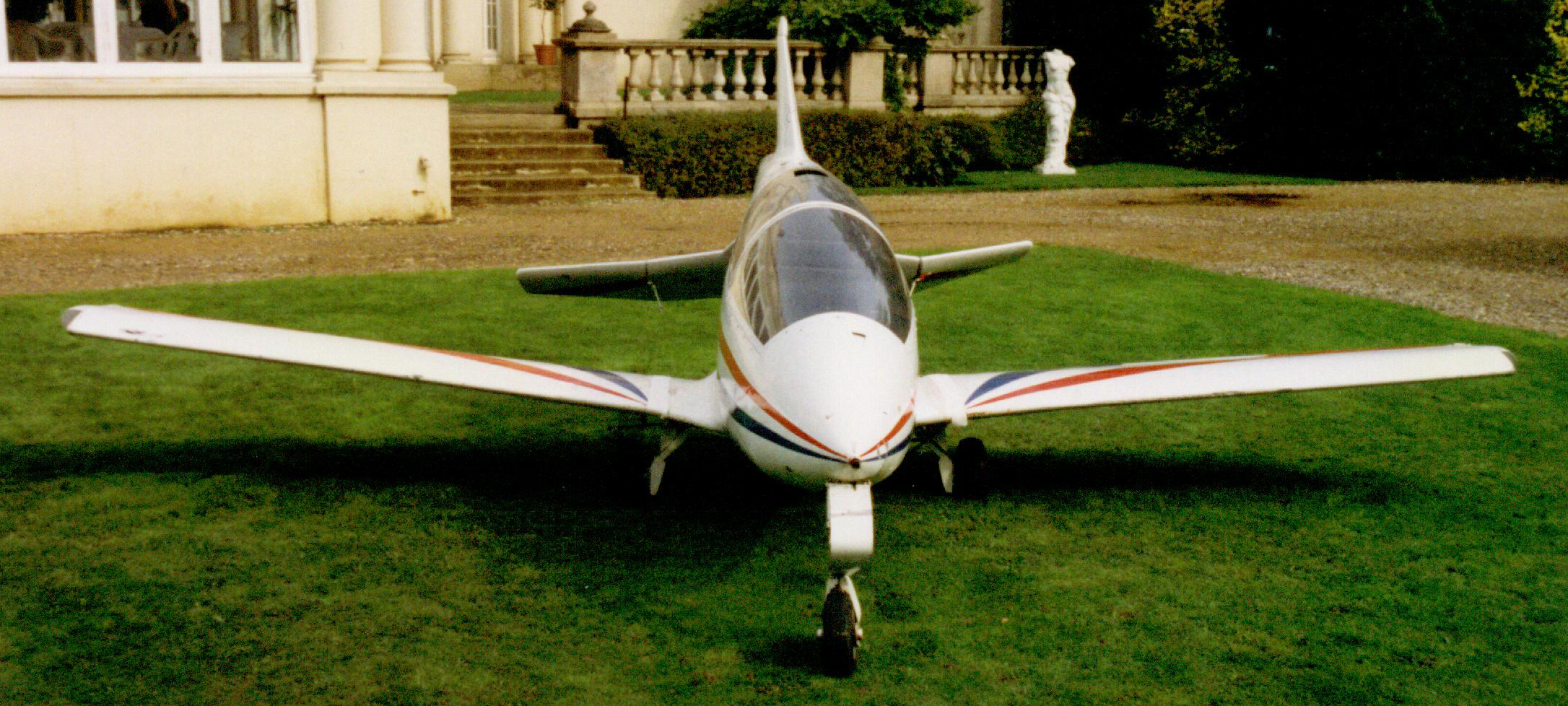
Acrostar from Octopussy seen at a convention

Stunt coordinator Martin Grace suffered an injury while shooting the scene where Bond climbs down the train to catch Octopussy's attention. During the second day of filming, Grace – who was Roger Moore's stunt double for the scene – carried on doing the scene longer than he should have, due to a miscommunication with the second unit director, and the train entered a section of the track which the team had not properly surveyed. Shortly afterwards, a concrete pole fractured Grace's left leg. The cyclist seen passing in the middle of a sword fight during the baby taxi chase sequence was in fact a bystander who passed through the shot, oblivious to the filming; his intrusion was captured by two cameras and left in the final film. Cameraman Alan Hume's last scene was that of Octopussy's followers rowing. That day, little time was left and it was decided to film the sunset at the eleventh hour.

The Fabergé egg in the film is based on a real one, made in 1897 and which is called the Imperial Coronation egg. The egg in the film is listed in the auction catalogue as being "The Property of a Lady", which is the name of one of Ian Fleming's short stories released in more recent editions of the collection Octopussy and The Living Daylights.

In a bit of diegesis, Vijay signals his affiliation to MI6 by playing the "James Bond Theme" on a recorder while Bond is disembarking from a boat in the harbour near the City Palace. Like his fictional counterpart, Vijay Amritraj had a distinct fear of snakes and found it difficult to hold the basket during filming.

=== Music ===
After being absent in For Your Eyes Only due to tax problems, John Barry returned to do his ninth Bond score. Barry made frequent references to the "James Bond Theme" to reinforce Octopussy as the official Bond film, given that the motif could not be featured in Never Say Never Again, and opted to include only subtle references to the music of India, avoiding instruments such as the sitar for feeling that authentic music "didn't work dramatically". He also wrote opening theme "All Time High" with lyricist Tim Rice. "All Time High", sung by Rita Coolidge, is one of seven musical themes in the James Bond series whose song titles do not refer to the film's title. "All Time High" spent four weeks at number one on the United States' Adult Contemporary singles chart and reached number 36 on the Billboard Hot 100.

The soundtrack album was released in 1985 by A&M Records; the compact disc version of this release was recalled due to a colour printing error which omitted the credits from the album cover, making it a rare collector's item. In 1997, the soundtrack was re-issued by Rykodisc, with the original soundtrack music and some film dialogue, on an Enhanced CD version. The 2003 release, by EMI, restored the original soundtrack music without dialogue.

== Release and reception ==
Octopussy premiered at the Odeon Leicester Square on 6 June 1983, with the Prince and Princess of Wales in attendance. The film earned slightly less than For Your Eyes Only, but still grossed $187.5 million, with $67.8 million in the United States and Canada. In the United Kingdom, the film grossed £8.3 million ($14.9 million). Other large international grosses include $15.7 million in Germany, $15.1 million in Japan and $9.1 million in France. The film also performed better than Never Say Never Again, the non-Eon Bond remake of Thunderball which was released a few months later and grossed $55 million in the United States and Canada. At the 11th Saturn Awards, Maud Adams was nominated for Best Supporting Actress. The film won the Golden Reel Award for Best Sound Editing. In Germany, it won the Golden Screen Award for selling over 3 million tickets.

=== Contemporary reviews ===
Gary Arnold of The Washington Post felt Octopussy was "one of the snazziest, wittiest productions" of the film series, in which he praised John Glen's direction, Louis Jourdan's performance, and the screenplay. Writing for The New York Times, Vincent Canby praised the film, but noted how "much of the story is incomprehensible". Gene Siskel, reviewing for The Chicago Tribune, awarded the film three stars out of four, stating it is "surprisingly entertaining—surprising because in his previous five Bond appearances Roger Moore has always come off as a smug stiff. In Octopussy Moore relaxes a bit and, just as important, his role is subordinated to the film's many and extremely exciting action scenes. Octopussy has the most sustained excitement in a Bond film since You Only Live Twice." However, he felt that the character Octopussy was detrimental to the film and the action "blunts a script that is weak on characterization and long on male chauvinism".

Variety felt the film's strong points were "the spectacular aerial stuntwork marking both the pre-credits teaser and extremely dangerous-looking climax. The rest of the action scenes are well-executed but suffer from a sense of deja vu, as in a speeding train that recalls Sean Connery's derring-do in The Great Train Robbery". Kevin Thomas of the Los Angeles Times felt the film proved "to be business as usual, no better or worse than most of its predecessors. After all this time, it's amazing that the same old formula still plays: the gadgetry, gorgeous girls, travelogue locales and the shameless double-entendres—in this instance, octo-entendres." Richard Corliss of Time magazine negatively reviewed Moore's performance, writing he has "degenerated [Bond] into a male model, and something of a genial anachronism." Derek Malcolm of The Guardian wrote the film "doesn't treat itself seriously for a moment ...Bond has now become almost totally absurdist, a parody of a parody. The film effectively disarms criticism, except that one might wish for the public to flock to something other than the technically ambitious."

=== Retrospective reviews ===
On Rotten Tomatoes, the film has an approval rating of 41% based on 49 reviews. The website's critical consensus reads: "Despite a couple of electrifying action sequences, Octopussy is a formulaic, anachronistic Bond outing." Metacritic, which uses a weighted average, assigned the film a score of 63 out of 100, based on 14 critics, indicating "generally favorable" reviews.

James Berardinelli said that the movie was long and confusing, and strongly criticised Steven Berkoff's performance, describing it as "offensively bad" and the worst performance of any Bond villain. A particular point of contention are comedic scenes where Bond is dressed in a clown costume, a gorilla outfit and doing a Tarzan yell during a jungle chase. As a result, it frequently ranks low in rankings of James Bond films, such as the ones by Entertainment Weekly, MSN, and IGN. C. J. Henderson reviewed Octopussy in The Space Gamer magazine, writing "there isn't a moment in the movie when we worry for the slightest instant that anything could happen to suave ol' James. Predictably, it doesn't. To kill Bond would be to lose the most bankable genre character ever brought to the movies."

By contrast, the elegance of the film locations in India, and the stunts on the aircraft and train were appreciated. GQ writer David Williams said Octopussy was "one of the best 'Bad Films' of the franchise", praising the entertaining characters but finding the silliness and Moore's advanced age problematic. Danny Peary wrote that Octopussy "has slow spots, little humour, and villains who aren't nearly of the calibre of Dr. No, Goldfinger, or Blofeld. Also, the filmmakers make the mistake of demeaning Bond by having him swing through the trees and emitting a Tarzan cry and having him hide in a gorilla suit and later disguise himself as a clown (whom all the kids at the circus laugh at). It's as if they're trying to remind us that everything is tongue-in-cheek, but that makes little sense, for this film is much more serious than typical Bond outings – in fact, it recalls the tone of From Russia with Love."

=== Character reviews ===
In 2006, Fandango ranked the character Octopussy as one of the top-10 Bond girls, and described her as "a powerful, impressive woman". Entertainment Weekly, however, ranked her as the 10th-worst Bond girl in one list in 2006 but as the best "babe" of the Roger Moore James Bond films in another list in 2008. A poll by Bond fans in 2008 elected Octopussy as the tenth-worst Bond Girl. Yahoo! Movies included the character in a 2012 list of the best Bond girl names, commenting: "This Bond girl moniker was so good, they named the film after her!"

=== Television ===
Octopussy premiered in North America on The ABC Sunday Night Movie on February 2, 1986. It placed third in its time period with a Nielsen Media Research household rating of 17.4, a 29% audience share, and approximately 25 million viewers. The movie started 18 minutes late due to an overrun earlier in the day of Wide World of Sports, which may have negatively impacted its performance slightly (a key action sequence near the end of the film did not air until after 11:30pm in the Eastern Time Zone).

== See also ==
- James Bond in film
- Outline of James Bond
