= This Year's Blonde =

- Print ad
- Based on: Moviola by Garson Kanin
- Teleplay by: James Lee
- Directed by: John Erman
- Starring: Constance Forslund; Lloyd Bridges; Norman Fell; Vic Tayback
- Music by: Elmer Bernstein
- Country of origin: United States
- Original language: English

Production
- Running time: 100 minutes

Original release
- Release: May 18, 1980

This Year's Blonde is a 1980 American television film directed by John Erman and starring Constance Forslund as Marilyn Monroe, Lloyd Bridges as Johnny Hyde, and Norman Fell. Based on the Garson Kanin novel Moviola about Monroe, the film was presented as part of a three-night TV special event on NBC titled Moviola: A Hollywood Saga.

This Year's Blonde was the first of two TV movies about Monroe in 1980; the second was Marilyn: The Untold Story, starring Catherine Hicks.

== Cast ==
- Constance Forslund as Marilyn Monroe
- Lloyd Bridges as Johnny Hyde
- Norman Fell as Pat Toledo
- Vic Tayback as Harry Cohn
- Michael Lerner as Jack L. Warner
- John Marley as Joe Schenck
- Richard Seer as Norman
- Lee Wallace as Samuel Goldwyn
- William Frankfather as John Huston
- Philip Sterling as Dr. Freed
- Sondra Blake as Mrs. Baker
- Barney Martin as Eddie Mannix
- Michael Strong as Sol Silverman
- Peter Maloney as Darryl Zanuck
- Stephen Keep Mills as Dore Schary
- Peggy Ann Garner as the Stepmother

== See also ==
- Moviola, 1979 novel by Garson Kanin, source material for this film
- The Scarlett O'Hara War (1980), the third installment of TV miniseries Moviola: A Hollywood Saga
