= The Far Side of Jericho =

- Directed by: Tim Hunter
- Written by: Rob Sullivan; James Crumley
- Starring: Patrick Bergin
- Cinematography: Patrick Cady
- Edited by: Tina Hirsch; Sunny Hodge
- Music by: Mark Adler
- Production companies: Further Productions; Mountainair Films
- Distributed by: First Look International
- Release date: December 10, 2006 (Santa Fe Film Festival)
- Running time: 99 minutes
- Country: United States
- Language: English

The Far Side of Jericho is a 2006 Western film directed by Tim Hunter. It stars Patrick Bergin and Lawrence Pressman.

== Plot ==
When three outlaw brothers are killed after a bank robbery, their widows, Maxine (Suzanne Andrews), Claire (Judith Burnett), and Bridget (Lissa Negrin), must escape from the murderous locals who think they know where he is hiding stolen money. Fleeing through New Mexico from Sheriff Jake (Patrick Bergin), banker Van Damm (Lawrence Pressman), Native Americans, and a group of vigilantes, among others, widows discover a map that appears to lead to the fortune of their deceased husbands.

Dangerous adventures will have to face the three widows after witnessing the live and public execution of their three husbands by the Hangman. They have to flee in the middle of a shooting, endure the glances of savage men in Rita's bar, the taunts of the Pinkerton cowboys about their husbands, and even the harassment of the occasional desperate gentleman. After the triple execution, the corrupt banker Van Damn and Sheriff Jake make a deal about getting the money from the widows. The three widows flee from many men in search of them. The Pinkerton Cowboys follow their trail from a distance and Jake and his friend "The French" are passionate about finding them. Women at certain times experience the ghostly presence of their deceased husbands (Bridget was the first to see them, mainly her husband "Little Jemmy" in the company of the banker's daughter Greta, then Claire as usual denigrated by the ghost of her 'ruffian' husband "Cash" and finally Maxine who had become a bit skeptical about it).

Three women fight against rules; Claire's struggle with alcohol and her fragile consistency, Bridget's courage (abused by Claire's fearsome husband once) being a prostitute and face the sexual harassment of the dirty and dominant Sheriff Jake and finally Maxine with her courage and strong character in several memorial scenes. For example: threatening Jake with death if necessary in order to stop the cruel execution of her husband, do the same with "The Kid" when he tries to steal a coin and when finding the kidnapped widows by the corrupt "Pinkerton" cowboys, rescue a poor wounded Claire (whipped by John and tortured with thermal water by David), neutralize the blond cowboy John with one shot after giving him a chance to regret and force the other cowboy David to disrobe, strip and disappear and threaten to kill him if he doesn't what Mrs. Thornton says. Flee embarrassed totally naked into the desert and hiding amongst rocks in the night (who desperately meets the preacher and his group of Mexican partners; Roberto and Segundo, the next day and after making fun of him, is killed in cold blood by the Hangman in a single shoot). Claire recovers from her injuries and together the three women set off for Jerico again when they met "The Kid" who guides them to a cave and steals their expensive horse. These women find refuge in the tavern of a dear friend of Bridget's (Madame Dubois) until they are found by Jake who offers them a deal in search of the money. Claire escapes at dawn while Maxine and Bridget go looking for her, find her, and they are helped by "The Stranger" who turns out to be just another "Thornton" in search of fortune. The women finally face the powerful in a final battle in which slow characters do not survive in the hot desert climate, as Roberto, who is mortally wounded by The Preacher's men and his brother-in-law (Segundo) who is neutralized by Claire while trying to kidnap her and Bridget. Women face horrible enemies to defeat especially against rivals as dashing as the old preacher or hangman; so bloody and wicked as to enjoy the sorrows of others, betray, kill and humiliate one of the "Pinkerton" cowboys leaving his naked body (David) ready for coyotes in the desert afternoon, beat "The Stranger" in a ramshackle cabin being challenged, use the God's word at his convenience, publicly make fun of "The Thornton" and torture them, intimidate the widows, retain Maxine (who defends herself and confronts him with an iron weapon) neutralize with a lethal shot the banker Van Damn (who throughout history is seen suffering the loss of his beloved Greta and thirsty for revenge and money) after confessing that he buried Greta with the three "Thornton" 'Bandidos ' in a dirty cave, to be finally neutralized by the wild Bridget.

During the final battle, Maxine confronts Jake face to face, but the sheriff is stopped by "The Kid" and his troop of native Indians being attacked by surprise by three sharp arrows. The three widows withdraw from battle after finding the whole money, Maxine gives the deeds to the only living "Thornton" (The Stranger) who remains unconscious, buries the memory of their husbands and their bodies along with Greta's body, says goodbye to Sheriff Jake and especially Maxine ready for new adventures, while they decide if the new destination would be San Francisco or Boston, or another land without letting no man stop them.

In the 1880s during the Wild West era, three widows of a recently executed gang of outlaw brothers are forced to flee their homes as they are pursued by a posse of vigilantes and villains seeking the whereabouts of their dead husbands' buried treasure. On the perilous journey, the woman must find the courage to trust, care and kill for one another, while blazing the trail to their own destiny.

== Cast ==
- Patrick Bergin as Jake
- Lawrence Pressman as Van Damn
- James Gammon as The Preacher
- John Diehl as Cash Thornton
- C. Thomas Howell as "Little Jemmy" Thornton
- Jason Connery as John Pinkerton
- Bill Doyle as David Pinkerton
- Suzanne Andrews as Maxine Thornton
- Judith Burnett as Claire Thornton
- Lissa Negrin as Bridget Thornton
- Tim DeKay as The Stranger
- Constance Forslund as Madame DuBois
- Vanessa Zima as Greta Van Damn
- Gary Carlos Cervantes as Segundo
- Debrianna Mansini as Rita
- Rio Alexander as Roberto
- Zachary Ray Sherman as The Kid

== Production ==
Shooting started in May 2005, in Santa Fe during its 23-day shoot in locations around New Mexico. Parts of the film were filmed in Zia Pueblo, Cook Ranch, Bonanza City and Diablo Canyon.
