= James Lee (screenwriter) =

American screenwriter

- Born: James Henderson Lee III; January 4, 1923; Pleasant Ridge, Michigan, United States
- Died: July 2, 2002 (aged 79); Santa Monica, California, United States
- Education: Harvard University
- Occupation: Screenwriter
- Spouse: Neva Patterson (m. 1957)
- Children: Megan Copeskey; Filippo Quaretti-Lee
- Writing career
- Years active: 1950–1987
- Notable work: Roots
- Notable awards: Edgar – Best Episode in a TV Series 1959 Omnibus; Humanitas Prize 1977 Roots

James Henderson Lee III (January 4, 1923 – July 2, 2002) was an American screenwriter. He is best known for writing several episodes of the 1977 TV miniseries Roots.

== Career ==
Born in Pleasant Ridge, Michigan, James Lee graduated from Harvard University and initially worked as a stage actor in New York. Not finding much success, he turned to screenwriting to supplement his income.

His fifth play Career, which drew on his experiences as a struggling actor, was an Off Broadway hit. Lee went on to write the screenplay for the 1959 film of the same name, starring Dean Martin, Tony Franciosa, and Shirley MacLaine.

Moving into television, Lee wrote four episodes of the anthology series Omnibus. One of these, "Capital Punishment", won an Edgar Award for Best Episode in a TV Series.

Lee continued to work as a screenwriter, primarily in television, from the 1960s through the 1980s. His greatest success came with the 1977 miniseries Roots. Adapting the 1976 novel by Alex Haley, Lee wrote four of the series' twelve episodes, and co-wrote four others.

He and William Blinn received a 1977 Humanitas Prize for writing "Part IV" of Roots, and Lee was nominated for an Emmy Award for "Part V". He had previously received an Emmy nomination in 1963 for the drama The Invincible Mr. Disraeli (shown on Hallmark Hall of Fame). He received a third Emmy nomination in 1980 for the Marilyn Monroe biopic This Year's Blonde.

== Personal life ==
James Lee married actress Neva Patterson in 1957, after they met on the set of the Broadway play The Seven Year Itch. The couple adopted a daughter, Megan, and a son, Filippo.

Lee died of heart failure and emphysema in 2002 at age 79.

== Select filmography ==
=== Television ===
- The Clock (1950)
- Lights Out (1950)
- Omnibus (1957–1960)
- The Invincible Mr. Disraeli (1963)
- The Diary of Anne Frank (1967)
- Rafferty (1977) - creator, writer, and producer
- Roots (1977)
- This Year's Blonde (1980)
- My Wicked, Wicked Ways: The Legend of Errol Flynn (1985)
- Napoleon and Josephine: A Love Story (1987)

=== Film ===
- Career (1959)
- The Adventures of Huckleberry Finn (1960)
- Banning (1967)
- Counterpoint (1968)
- Change of Habit (1969)
