= Constance Forslund =

American actress

- Born: June 19, 1950 (age 76); San Diego, California, U.S.
- Education: New York University (MFA)
- Occupation: Actress
- Years active: 1968–present

Constance Forslund (born June 19, 1950) is an American actress whose performances include a revival of Clare Boothe Luce's The Women on Broadway and the films The Way We Were and The Great Bank Hoax.

== Career ==
In television movies, Forslund portrayed Ginger Grant in The Harlem Globetrotters on Gilligan's Island and Marilyn Monroe in This Year's Blonde, one of a series of three movie specials under the Moviola name. She also appeared on such television series as Fantasy Island, Taxi, One Day at a Time, Trapper John, M.D., CHiPs, Magnum, P.I., The Love Boat, Murder, She Wrote, It's a Living and ER.

== Filmography ==
=== Film ===
| Year | Title | Role | Notes |
|---|---|---|---|
| 1972 | Hail | Sara Burd | |
| 1973 | The Way We Were | Jenny | |
| 1977 | The Great Bank Hoax | Patricia Potter | |
| 1983 | Uncommon Valor | Mrs. Charts | |
| 1986 | River's Edge | Madeleine | |
| 1987 | Baby Boom | Receptionist | |
| 1995 | Village of the Damned | Callie Blum | |
| 1997 | Clockwatchers | Flight Attendant | Uncredited |
| 2006 | The Far Side of Jericho | Madame DuBois | |

=== Television ===
| Year | Title | Role | Notes |
|---|---|---|---|
| 1972–1973 | The Doctors | Donna | 5 episodes |
| 1975 | The Legend of Valentino | Silent Star | Television film |
| 1978 | Fantasy Island | Elaine Benson | Episode: "Treasure Hunt/Beauty Contest" |
| 1978 | One Day at a Time | Bunny | 2 episodes |
| 1978 | Big Bob Johnson and His Fantastic Speed Circus | Julie Hunsacker | Television film |
| 1979 | Pleasure Cove | Kim Parker | Television film |
| 1979 | Taxi | Janet | Episode: "A Woman Between Friends" |
| 1979 | A Shining Season | Mary Anne | Television film |
| 1980 | This Year's Blonde | Marilyn Monroe | Television film |
| 1981 | Enos | Karen | Episode: "Horse Cops" |
| 1981 | The Harlem Globetrotters on Gilligan's Island | Ginger Grant | Television film |
| 1981 | Trapper John, M.D. | Carol Collins / Lorna Latour | 2 episodes |
| 1981–1983 | CHiPs | Hildy Hopkins / Charlie | 2 episodes |
| 1982 | It's a Living | Cindy | Episode: "Strange Bedfellows" |
| 1983 | Magnum, P.I. | Sandy | Episode: "Home from the Sea" |
| 1983 | The Love Boat | Fran / Tisha Hudson | 2 episodes |
| 1983 | Days of Our Lives | Abigail Duncan | 2 episodes |
| 1985 | Murder, She Wrote | Lucinda Lark | Episode: "Footnote to Murder" |
| 1986 | One Life to Live | Jeannie Johnson | 5 episodes |
| 1989 | Thirtysomething | Diane | Episode: "Pilgrims" |
| 1996 | The Burning Zone | Woman on the Monitor | Episode: "Touch of the Dead" |
| 1996 | Sliders | Fiona | Episode: "Desert Storm" |
| 1999 | Promised Land | Mrs. Sterling | Episode: "In the Money" |
| 2009 | ER | Nina | Episode: "The Beginning of the End" |
| 2011–2021 | Ave 43 | Barbara | 31 episodes |
| 2016 | Castle | Mrs. Samantha Northcliff | Episode: "The Blame Game" |
| 2016 | The Mop and Lucky Files | Vicki | Episode: "Tracking Those Hours" |
| 2019 | Baskets | Shelby | Episode: "Homemakers" |
