= Gaye Kruger =

American actress

- Born: Gaye Rescher; April 17, 1951 (age 75); Los Angeles, California
- Other names: Gaye Rescher Ribble, Gaye Kruger Ribble
- Education: Greenwich High School
- Alma mater: Neighborhood Playhouse School of the Theatre
- Occupations: Actress, singer, dancer, voice actress, promotional marketing consultant
- Years active: 1976–present
- Notable credit(s): Wicked City as Makie (Streamline dub)
- Spouse: Dave Ribble
- Relatives: Dee Dee Rescher (sister)
- Website: http://www.daveribble.com/

Gaye Kruger (born Gaye Rescher on April 17, 1951), also known as Gaye Rescher Ribble and Gaye Kruger Ribble, is a former American actress and voice actress. She is the sister of actress Dee Dee Rescher.

After playing small roles in various stage, television and film productions (including Mr. Mom, Eight is Enough and The Scarlett O'Hara War), she gained recognition for her voice performance as Makie in the Streamline Pictures English dub of Yoshiaki Kawajiri's OVA film Wicked City, released in 1993 in North America. Wicked City is her only known role as a voice actress.

Kruger has effectively retired from acting, and now works with her husband, David Ribble, and his company StandOut Marketing Strategies, providing business and marketing strategies to clients.

== Selected filmography ==
Year	Title	Role	Notes
1975	Queen of the Stardust Ballroom	Young Woman	Television film
1976	Police Story	Nurse	Episode: "Officer Dooly"
1980	The Scarlett O'Hara War	Lorraine	Television film
1981	Eight is Enough	Stephanie	Episode: "The Way We Were"
1982	Illusions by Julie Dash	Leila Grant	Short film
1983	Mr. Mom	Secretary	
1992	Venice/Venice	Interviewee	
1993	Wicked City	Makie	Streamline dub
1995	The Feminine Touch	Kathryn Berrie	Direct-to-video
