= City of Angels (1976 TV series) =

- Created by: Stephen J. Cannell; Roy Huggins
- Starring: Wayne Rogers; Elaine Joyce; Clifton James; Philip Sterling; Timmie Rogers
- Country of origin: United States
- No. of seasons: 1
- No. of episodes: 13

Production
- Executive producer: Jo Swerling Jr.
- Production companies: Roy Huggins-Public Arts Productions; Universal Television

Original release
- Network: NBC
- Release: February 3 – May 18, 1976

City of Angels is a 1976 American television series created by Stephen J. Cannell and Roy Huggins, who had previously worked together on The Rockford Files. American mystery novelist Max Allan Collins has called City of Angels "the best private eye series ever."

== Plot ==
Wayne Rogers plays Jake Axminster, a determined but not wholly ethical private detective, who looks out for himself amid the corruption of Los Angeles, California, in the mid-1930s. He is aided in his investigative efforts by two friends: his ditzy blonde secretary, Marsha Finch (Elaine Joyce), who also runs a call-girl business on the side, and attorney Michael Brimm (Philip Sterling). Brimm is called upon frequently to defend Axminster from charges (mostly trumped-up) leveled against him by Lieutenant Murray Quint (Clifton James), a fat, cigar-chomping, and thoroughly crooked member of the Los Angeles Police Department.

Axminster trusts no one completely, not even his attorney. He drives a 1934 ragtop Studebaker and keeps his office in downtown L.A.’s historic Bradbury Building, phone number OXford-8704. (Brimm’s office is located just across the hall.) For his services, Axminster charges $25 a day plus expenses. Although Brimm describes him as “Mr. Play-It-Safe,” Axminster regularly places himself in danger by helping friends and annoying the police with his questions. His efforts frequently result in his being beaten up. So often does Quint order his thrashing, that Axminster has taken to having nude photographs shot of himself in order to prove later on how aggressive the cops were in their interrogations.

The detective drinks coffee addictively. When one client asks him whether his habit keeps him up, Axminster responds, “No, but it helps.” He appears to be constantly in debt, and he’s not above borrowing money from friends and even from his bootblack, Lester (Timmie Rogers). Axminster “gripes in general about the cost of staying alive. ‘All the angels left this burg about 20 years ago,’ is his succinct summation of the 1930s ...”

== Background ==
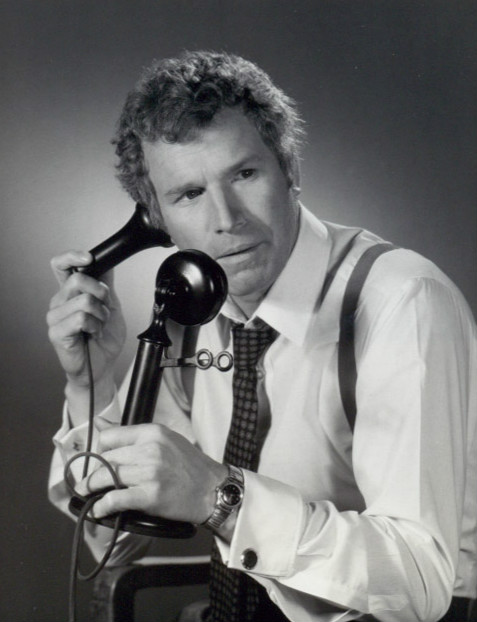
Rogers as 1930s L.A. private eye Jake Axminster.

Inspired by the 1974 film Chinatown, City of Angels adopted the same cynical view of Depression era Los Angeles, a place where Hollywood and crime competed for attention. This series also found its roots in Roy Huggins’ hard-boiled 1946 detective novel, The Double Take, which had earlier provided the source material for another Huggins-created series, 77 Sunset Strip. Individual installments of this show were based on real-life events. The three-part pilot episode, “The November Plan,” was based on a notorious 1933 American conspiracy known as the Business Plot, which involved wealthy businessmen trying to bring down United States President Franklin D. Roosevelt in a coup. Another episode, "The Castle of Dreams," featured a pricey brothel where the prostitutes were movie-star lookalikes. That establishment was based on the historical T&M Studio (later fictionalized in L.A. Confidential as the "Fleur de Lis Club"). During the show's run, Nazism, communism, railroad-riding hoboes, and the Ku Klux Klan all figured into the plots.

Like Banyon, an earlier and similar American series set in Los Angeles, City of Angels was short-lived. Only 13 hour-long episodes were produced before NBC decided to cancel the program. Critics argued that the TV audience did not easily connect with Rogers as a tough, wise-cracking gumshoe. TV Guide's Cleveland Amory wrote: "Altogether, Mr. Rogers does not seem completely at home in his part, but he does assault the Bogart-style dialogue with appeal, if not aplomb. When, in the first episode, a starlet (Meredith Baxter Birney) can't afford to pay him, she offers him her rings and he says he'll have them appraised. 'You aren't very subtle,' she says. 'You want subtlety,' he says, 'it'll cost 10 bucks a day more.'"

Series co-creator Huggins was said to have thought Rogers was miscast. Meanwhile, Rogers had his own gripes. An "associate of his" was quoted in TV Guide as saying that "Wayne actually tore up Angels scripts while they were shooting on the set and rewrote them himself. He hated the material they gave him." That article continued:

Rogers says, "Angels is a classic example of convoluted, disconnected, bad storytelling." The show had share-of-audience figures of 50%, 31% and 29% for the first three episodes—certainly a respectable record for a mid-season replacement. "These were fine episodes, written by Steve Cannell," says Rogers. "After that, the others couldn't match Cannell's pace and the bottom fell out."

He mostly blames lack of story preparation time for the demise of Angels. "Often we'd have only an outline in hand, with the shooting deadline almost upon us. Sometimes we'd have a script only at the very last minute. I never heard of a show where you shot through the night and ran out of darkness, but that's what happened to us.

"The other big factor was that we'd see someone lost or murdered on page 1 of the script and Jake Axminster would be hired to handle the matter. Then we'd have 49 pages of red herrings. On page 50 we'd come back to the initial thesis. We were seeing non sequiturs all over the place. You can't get away with that."

Wayne Rogers was paid $25,000 a week for his starring role in City of Angels, his first series since departing from M*A*S*H the previous year.

The series' theme music was composed by Nelson Riddle.

City of Angels was repeated on the A&E Network for several years beginning in 1990, and then made another brief appearance as part of a package of Universal series airing on TV Land, starting in 1999.

== Episodes ==
Note that Roy Huggins is credited as a writer under his own name for episodes 1, 2, 3 and 9, and as "John Thomas James" for episodes 4, 6, 7, 8 and 11.

No.	Title	Directed by	Written by	Original release date
1	"The November Plan, Part I"	Don Medford	Story by : Stephen J. Cannell & Roy Huggins; Teleplay by : Stephen J. Cannell	February 3, 1976
Mary, an actress, (Meredith Baxter Birney) is arrested for her boyfriend's murder after they witness a fight at a party. She hires private detective Jake Axminster. Additional guest stars Diane Ladd and Laurence Luckinbill
2	"The November Plan, Part II"	Don Medford	Story by : Stephen J. Cannell & Roy Huggins; Teleplay by : Stephen J. Cannell	February 10, 1976
Fearing she knows too much, conspirators target Mary (Meredith Baxter Birney). Dorothy Malone makes a special guest star appearance.
3	"The November Plan, Part III"	Don Medford	Story by : Stephen J. Cannell & Roy Huggins; Teleplay by : Stephen J. Cannell	February 17, 1976
Jake suspects conspiracy against his client Mary's (Meredith Baxter Birney) accusation of murder. The investigation involves the police department, and the disappearance of a newspaper reporter.
4	"The Parting Shot"	Sigmund Neufeld, Jr.	Story by : John Thomas James; Teleplay by : Philip DeGuere, Jr.	February 24, 1976
Jake is hired to follow an elderly man's wife who is suspected of being unfaithful, but his client is shot and comatose.
5	"A Lonely Way to Die"	Douglas Heyes	Douglas Heyes	March 2, 1976
Corrupt cops write off the death of Jake's friend as accidental asphyxiation. The investigation leads Jake to an ex-governor running for president.
6	"The House on Orange Grove Avenue"	Robert Douglas	Story by : John Thomas James; Teleplay by : Stephen & Elinor Karpf	March 16, 1976
Jake is hired by two sisters (Susan Howard and Susan Sullivan) to investigate the 1927 killing of an unfaithful husband and his girlfriend. The sisters have been rumored to be the murderers. Lara Parker also guest stars
7	"Palm Springs Answer"	Alan Reisner	Story by : John Thomas James; Teleplay by : Merwin Gerard	March 23, 1976
A woman hires Jake to find her missing daughter. He discovers the daughter was a nightclub dancer with connections to a gambling mob and the death of a millionaire. A rare guest starring role by Signe Hasso
8	"The Losers"	Barry Shear	Story by : John Thomas James; Teleplay by : Gloryette Clark & John Thomas James	April 6, 1976
Jake investigates whether a successful businessman's (Broderick Crawford) girlfriend is being faithful to him, but he finds her dead. Maria Strassmann also guest star
9	"A Sudden Silence"	Douglas Heyes	Story by : Roy Huggins; Teleplay by : Douglas Heyes	April 13, 1976
Jake investigates three men following a rich college student (Darleen Carr) and her boyfriend. Jake encounters organized opposition to him solving the case.
10	"The Castle of Dreams"	Robert Douglas	Story by : Stephen J. Cannell & Philip DeGuere, Jr. Teleplay by : Stephen J. Cannell	April 20, 1976
A woman's abduction is linked to murder and police corruption. Veronica Hamel has a small part.
11	"Say Goodbye to Yesterday"	Jerry London	Story by : John Thomas James; Teleplay by : Gloryette Clark	May 4, 1976
Jake searches for a rich businessman's wife and finds evidence of her shady past.
12	"The Bloodshot Eye"	Hy Averback	Philip DeGuere, Jr.	May 11, 1976
After a life-insurance benefit has been paid Jake is hired to determine if the insured is still alive. Jake decides to go grave digging.
13	"Match Point"	Ralph Senensky	Richard Boeth	May 18, 1976
A woman (Dana Wynter) hires Jake to clear a tennis player accused of a murder that took place during a tennis tournament. Jake discovers a link to a political plot.
