= Clifton James =

American actor (1920–2017)

- Clifton James as Sheriff J.W. Pepper in Live and Let Die (1973)
- Born: George Clifton James; May 29, 1920; Spokane, Washington, U.S.
- Died: April 15, 2017 (aged 96); Gladstone, Oregon, U.S.
- Education: University of Oregon; Actors Studio
- Occupation: Actor
- Years active: 1954–2006
- Spouses: Donna Lea Beach (m. 1948; div. 1950) Laurie Harper (m. 1951; died 2015)
- Children: 6
- Military career
- Allegiance: United States
- Branch: United States Army
- Service years: 1942–45
- Units: Co. "A" 163rd Infantry, 41st Division
- Conflicts: World War II; Pacific War; New Guinea campaign

George Clifton James (May 29, 1920 – April 15, 2017) was an American actor of film, theatre, and television. He was best known to screen audiences for his various character roles, including prison floorwalker Carr in Cool Hand Luke (1967), Sheriff J.W. Pepper alongside Roger Moore in the James Bond films Live and Let Die (1973) and The Man with the Golden Gun (1974), the sheriff in Silver Streak (1976) and Superman II (1980), a Texas tycoon in The Bad News Bears in Breaking Training (1977), and Charles Comiskey in Eight Men Out (1988).

== Early life and education ==
James was born in Spokane, Washington, the son of Grace (née Dean), a teacher, and Harry James, a journalist. He grew up in Oregon in the Gladstone area of Clackamas County.

James was a decorated World War II United States Army veteran. He served as an infantry platoon sergeant with Co. "A" 163rd Infantry, 41st Division. He served forty-two months in the South Pacific from January 1942 until August 1945. His decorations include the Silver Star, Bronze Star, and two Purple Hearts.

After the war, James attended the University of Oregon on the G.I. Bill, where he developed his interesting in acting. He later moved to New York City, where he continued his studies at the Actors Studio.

== Career ==
James began his career in theater in New York City, and was a graduated of the Actors Studio. He became well known for playing the comic-relief role of Louisiana Sheriff J.W. Pepper in the James Bond films Live and Let Die (1973) and The Man With The Golden Gun (1974). He played very similar characters in both Silver Streak (1976) and Superman II (1980). Years earlier he portrayed a serious character in The Reivers (1969), opposite Steve McQueen, playing a mean, corrupt country sheriff. Two years before that, he had portrayed a hard-nosed Southern prison floor-walker in Cool Hand Luke (1967). In Juggernaut (1974) he portrayed one of the first passengers aboard a luxury liner to realize there was a serious problem with the ship.

James appeared in the uncredited role of the district attorney who prosecuted Al Capone in the film The Untouchables (1987). He played a Navy master-at-arms in The Last Detail (1973), starring Jack Nicholson, and Chicago White Sox baseball team owner Charles Comiskey in Eight Men Out (1988), a drama about the corrupt 1919 Chicago White Sox.

Despite being born in the Northwest and spending much of his life in New York (where he was an Actors Studio member of long standing), James was cast as a Southerner in many of his screen roles, such as his appearances in the James Bond films, and as powerful Houston lawyer Striker Bellman in the daytime soap opera Texas from 1981 to 1982.

In 1965, he played “Sam Hare”, a slimy, blackmailing salesman on the TV Western Gunsmoke in the episode “The Lady” (S10E27). He guest-starred again as Tenner Jackson, a successful poker player later killed for his winnings in the episode “The Wrong Man” - alongside Carroll O’Connor (S12E7). Later, he played the train passenger Wilkes on the Gunsmoke episode "Snow Train" (1970).

James again portrayed a Southern character when he played Sheriff Lester Crabb, a temporary one-off replacement for regular Sheriff Rosco P. Coltrane (James Best) in the second-season Dukes of Hazzard episode "Treasure of Hazzard" (1980). He appeared on 13 episodes of the sitcom Lewis & Clark in 1981–1982. Other television credits include the 1976 private-eye drama City of Angels and the miniseries Captains and the Kings (1976). He appeared in two episodes of The A-Team: as murderous prison warden Beale in the first-season episode "Pros and Cons" (1983) and as corrupt Sheriff Jake Dawson in the second season's "The White Ballot" (1983). In 1996, he played the role of Red Kilgreen on All My Children. James appeared in the 1979 pilot episode of Hart to Hart playing the part of a highway cop.

His other film roles include those of a wealthy Montana land baron whose cattle are being rustled in Rancho Deluxe (1975) and as the source who tips off a newspaperman to a potentially explosive story in The Bonfire of the Vanities (1990). James was featured a number of times by writer-director John Sayles, including Eight Men Out (1988), Lone Star (1996) and Sunshine State (2002).

James' last known film appearance was in Raising Flagg (2006), although he had been cast in a starring role to appear in the feature film Old Soldiers, playing a true-to-life elderly veteran of World War II. Production on that film was halted in 2016.

== Personal life ==
James married twice: to Donna Lea Beach from 1948 to 1950, with whom he had one child, and to Laurie Harper, from 1951 until her death in 2015, with whom he had five children. He resided in Gladstone, Oregon.

=== Death ===
James died from complications of diabetes on April 15, 2017, aged 96.

== Theatre credits ==
Year	Title	Role	Venue	Notes
1955	The Time of Your Life	Cop	New York City Center, New York	
1957	Career	Robert Kensington	7th Avenue South Playhouse, New York	
1957–1958	The Cave Dwellers	Wrecking Crew Boss	Bijou Theatre, New York	
1958–1959	J.B.	Roustabout	ANTA Playhouse, New York	
1959	Sweet Confession	Michaud	Theatre de Lys, New York	
1960	The Tempest	Stephano	American Shakespeare Theatre, Stratford	
1960	Antony and Cleopatra	Sextus Pompeius	American Shakespeare Theatre, Stratford	
1960	Twelfth Night	Antonio	American Shakespeare Theatre, Stratford	
1960	The Long Dream	Clem	Ambassador Theatre, New York	
1960–1961	All the Way Home	Ralph Follet	Belasco Theatre, New York	
1962	Great Day in the Morning	Brennan Farrell	Henry Miller's Theatre, New York	
1962–1963	A Man's a Man	Polly Baker	Stage 42, New York	
1963	Andorra	The Carpenter	Biltmore Theatre, New York	
1965	And Things That Go Bump in the Night	Fa	Royale Theatre, New York	
1965	The Last Days of Lincoln	—N/a	Theatre de Lys, New York	Director
1966	The Coop	Danny	Actors' Playhouse, New York	
1967	The Trial of Lee Harvey Oswald	Lawrence Phelps	ANTA Playhouse, New York	
1977	The Shadow Box	Joe	Morosco Theatre, New York	Replacement
1977	The Shadow Box	Joe	Lunt-Fontanne Theatre, New York	Replacement
1980	American Buffalo	Donny Dubrow	Long Wharf Theatre, New Haven	
1981	American Buffalo	Donny Dubrow	Circle in the Square Theatre, New York	
1983	Total Abandon	Ben Hammerstein	Booth Theatre, New York	

== Selected filmography ==
- The Strange One (1957) as Colonel Ramsey
- The Last Mile (1959) as Harris
- Something Wild (1961) as Detective Bogart
- Experiment in Terror (1962) as Captain Moreno
- David and Lisa (1962) as John
- Black Like Me (1964) as Eli Carr
- Invitation to a Gunfighter (1964) as Tuttle
- The Chase (1966) as Lem Brewster
- The Happening (1967) as O'Reilly
- The Caper of the Golden Bulls (1967) as Philippe
- Cool Hand Luke (1967) as Carl
- Will Penny (1967) as Catron
- The Reivers (1969) as Butch Lovemaiden
- ...tick...tick...tick... (1970) as D.J. Rankin
- WUSA (1970) as "Speed", Sailor In Bar
- The Biscuit Eater (1972) as Mr. Eben
- The New Centurions (1972) as "Whitey"
- Kid Blue (1973) as Mr. Hendricks
- Live and Let Die (1973) as Sheriff J.W. Pepper
- The Werewolf of Washington (1973) as Attorney General
- The Iceman Cometh (1973) as Pat McGloin
- The Last Detail (1973) as M.A.A.
- The Laughing Policeman (1973) as Officer Jim Maloney SFPD Bomb Squad
- Bank Shot (1974) as Streiger
- Buster and Billie (1974) as Jake
- Juggernaut (1974) as Corrigan
- The Man With The Golden Gun (1974) as Sheriff J.W. Pepper
- Rancho Deluxe (1975) as John Brown
- Friendly Persuasion (1975) as Sam Jordan
- The Deadly Tower (1975) as Captain Fred Ambrose
- From Hong Kong with Love (1975) as Bill
- Silver Streak (1976) as Sheriff Oliver Chauncey
- The Bad News Bears in Breaking Training (1977) as Sy Orlansky
- Caboblanco (1980) as Lorrimer
- Superman II (1980) as Sheriff
- The Dukes of Hazzard (1980) as Sheriff Lester Crabb
- Talk to Me (1984) as State Trooper
- Kidco (1984) as Orville Peterjohn
- Stiffs (1985) as Uncle Leo
- Where Are the Children? (1986) as Chief Coffin
- The Untouchables (1987) as George E.Q. Johnson (uncredited)
- Whoops Apocalypse (1988) as Maxton S. Pluck
- Eight Men Out (1988) as Charles "Commy" Comiskey
- Murder She Wrote - The Last Flight of the Dixie Damsel (1988) as Ray Dressler
- Walter & Carlo i Amerika (1989) as "Tex"
- She-Devil (1989) as Bob's Father (uncredited)
- The Bonfire of the Vanities (1990) as Albert Fox
- Lone Star (1996) as Hollis Pogue
- Interstate 84 (2000) as Buddy
- Sunshine State (2002) as Buster Bidwell
- Raising Flagg (2006) as Ed McIvor
