= Career (1959 film) =

1959 film

- Poster
- Directed by: Joseph Anthony
- Screenplay by: James Lee
- Based on: Career by James Lee
- Produced by: Hal Wallis
- Starring: Dean Martin; Anthony Franciosa; Shirley MacLaine; Carolyn Jones
- Cinematography: Joseph LaShelle
- Edited by: Warren Low
- Music by: Franz Waxman
- Distributed by: Paramount Pictures
- Release date: October 7, 1959
- Running time: 105 minutes
- Country: United States
- Language: English
- Box office: $3 million (est. US/ Canada rentals)

Career is a 1959 American drama film directed by Joseph Anthony and starring Dean Martin, Tony Franciosa, and Shirley MacLaine.

The movie is the story of actor Sam Lawson (Franciosa) who is bent on breaking into the big time at any cost, braving World War II, the Korean War and even the blacklist.

The film is based on the play written by James Lee, which premiered at the off-Broadway Seventh Avenue South Playhouse in New York City in 1957. In turn, the play is loosely based on the 1936 novel of the same name by Phil Stong, which had been previously adapted for the screen in 1939 by Dalton Trumbo and Bert Granet.

Lee adapted his own play for the 1959 version. The film was nominated for three Academy Awards and won one Golden Globe Award for Franciosa.

== Plot ==
Back from action in World War II, Sam Lawson leaves home and friends in Lansing, Michigan to fulfil his ambitions to make it as an actor in New York. After many auditions he joins the off-Broadway grassroots theatre group called the Actors' Rostrum, run by actor-director Maurice "Maury" Novak out of a seamen's mission in Greenwich Village. When the theatre group runs out of money, Novak leaves the theater eventually to become a well known Hollywood director.

Both men know Sharon Kensington, who is the alcoholic daughter of powerful Broadway producer Robert Kensington.

Lawson continually tries to establish himself as an actor, suffering the slings and arrows of rejection despite his dedication and passion for the theater. It costs him his first wife. Lawson's long-suffering agent Shirley Drake attempts to get him work and after marrying Sharon Kensington and with the grudging backing of his new father-in-law, Lawson's star slowly begins to rise. But Sharon is in love with Novak and pregnant with his child. Lawson makes a deal to give her a divorce for the lead in the new Novak production. But Novak reneges on the deal. After more struggle, Drake manages to find Lawson a job but he has been called up from the reserves to serve in Korea, where he sees out the end of the war.

Lawson returns to the rounds of auditions in New York. Just as he's about to land a long-term TV announcing job, his loyalty is researched and to Lawson's shock he is found to be on the blacklist. This is owing to his connection with Novak and the allegedly "subversive" theater work of the Actors' Rostrum. Drake explains, "Sam, these are very responsible, patriotic people. They're just trying to protect their country." The now blacklisted Lawson, reflecting the realities of real-life blacklisted actors, is forced to take work as a waiter. When Drake asks him what he's going to do, Lawson replies: "There's only one thing for me to do. Survive." In one sense this was among Hollywood's first direct documentations of the blacklist in a dramatic film.

Novak, himself on the skids, appears back in Lawson's life, vowing to start fresh with a new off-Broadway theater. Novak confesses that he was briefly a communist in the past, but for opportunistic, career reasons. He offers Lawson a chance to work together again. After an accidental meeting with his first wife, who now understands Lawson's ambition, Lawson quits restaurant work and accepts the offer. With the blacklist past, the new play becomes successful and heads to Broadway. With Lawson finally emerging as a major actor, Drake, who has fallen in love with Lawson, asks him in the final scene, thinking of his struggles and humiliation, if it was "worth it."

"Yes," says Lawson. "It was worth it."

== Cast ==
- Dean Martin as Maury Novak
- Tony Franciosa as Sam Lawson
- Shirley MacLaine as Sharon Kensington
- Carolyn Jones as Shirley Drake
- Joan Blackman as Barbara Lawson Helmsley
- Robert Middleton as Robert Kensington
- Donna Douglas as Marjorie Burke
- Jerry Paris as Allan Burke
- Frank McHugh as Charlie
- Chuck Wassil as Eric Peters
- Mary Treen as Marie, secretary to Shirley Drake
- Yuki Shimoda as Yosho
- Alan Hewitt as Matt Helmsley
- Marjorie Bennett as Columnist

== Awards ==
The film won the Golden Globe Award for Best Actor – Motion Picture Drama (Franciosa)

The film was nominated for three Academy Awards:

- Best Art Direction (Hal Pereira, Walter H. Tyler, Samuel M. Comer, and Arthur Krams)
- Best Cinematography (Joseph LaShelle)
- Best Costume Design (Edith Head)
