= Dee Dee Rescher =

American actress

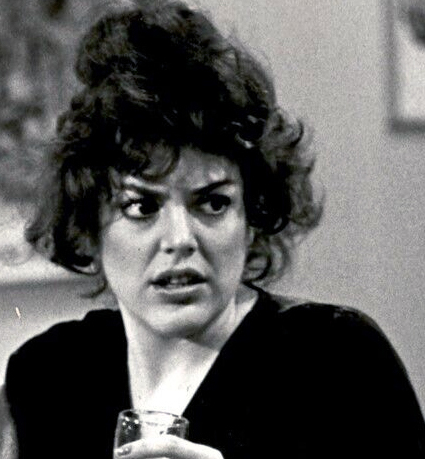
- Rescher in 1981
- Occupation: Actress
- Years active: 1973–present
- Spouse: Keith Auck (m.2016)
- Relatives: Gaye Kruger (sister); Otto Kruger (grandfather)
- Website: Deedeerescher.com

Dee Dee Rescher is an American actress known for her acting and voice-over roles in both film and television.

== Early life ==
She is the daughter of Jewish cinematographer Gayne Rescher (Jay Gayne Rescher) and actress Ottilie Kruger. Her paternal grandparents were cinematographer Jay Rescher and silent film actress Jean Tolley, and her maternal grandparents were actor Otto Kruger (who was related to South African pioneer and president Paul Kruger) and Sue MacManamy.

== Filmography ==
- 2025 St. Denis Medical as Ruth (episode Nobody Even Mentions the Brownies!)
- 2018 Famous in Love as Brenda (episode The Kids Aren't Alright)
- 2017 Captain Underpants: The First Epic Movie as Ms. Tara Ribble
- 2015–2017 Star vs. the Forces of Evil as Margaret Skullnick
- 2014 Anger Management as Ellen
- 2014 Manhattan Love Story as Blanche
- 2011 Good Luck Charlie as Shirley
- 2010 Mafia II as Additional Voices
- 2010 God of War: Ghost of Sparta (video game) as The Lava Titan Thera (voice)(credited as Didi Rescher)
- 2009 My Name Is Earl as Homeless Woman
- 2007 Hellboy Animated: Blood and Iron as Additional Voices
- 2006 W.I.T.C.H. as Professor Vargas (voice)
- 2005 The Buzz on Maggie as New Maggie (voice)
- 2005–2007 The Life and Times of Juniper Lee as Additional Voices
- 2005 The Comeback as Donna Franklin
- 2005 Zatch Bell! as Additional Voices
- 2005 Malcolm in the Middle as Flora
- 2005 All Grown Up! as Additional Voices
- 2005 JAG as Doris
- 2003–2007 My Life as a Teenage Robot as Additional Voices
- 2003 What's New, Scooby-Doo? as Sylvie (voice)
- 2002–2008 Codename: Kids Next Door as Additional Voices
- 2002–2003 Whatever Happened to... Robot Jones? as Additional Voices
- 2002 Elise: Mere Mortal as Receptionist
- 2002 Even Stevens as Babs Mendel
- 2001–2004 Samurai Jack as Additional Voices
- 2001 Time Squad as Sister Thornley (voice)
- 2001 A Mother's Testimony as Claire
- 2001 Grosse Pointe as Gayla Nethercott
- 2000 Nothing But the Truth as Angie Fitzsimmons
- 1999–2001 The King of Queens as Dorothy
- 1999 Party of Five as Mindy
- 1999 Johnny Bravo as Guard (voice)
- 1999 Lost & Found as Sally
- 1999 California Myth as Nurse Reilly
- 1999 It's Like, You Know... as Mrs. Beckworthy
- 1998–2004 The Powerpuff Girls as Additional Voices
- 1998 Recess as Additional Voices
- 1998 Looking for Lola as Neighbor
- 1997–1999 I Am Weasel as Additional Voices
- 1997 Rugrats as Little Girl (voice)
- 1997 Cow and Chicken as Baboon's Mom (voice)
- 1996 Quack Pack as Army General Stetic (voice)
- 1996 Something So Right as Bertha
- 1996 The Jamie Foxx Show as Mrs. Biacci
- 1996 Almost Perfect as Micki Schuster
- 1996 Friends as Record Producer
- 1996 Cybill as Mrs. Hartford
- 1996 Hey Arnold! as Torvald's Mother (voice)
- 1996 The Grave as Metal Voice
- 1996–2003 Dexter's Laboratory as Peltra (voice) / Additional Voices
- 1996 Siegfried & Roy: Masters of the Impossible as Additional Voices
- 1995 Hope and Gloria as Roma
- 1995 University Hospital as Dorette Nicholson
- 1995 Lois & Clark: The New Adventures of Superman as Mrs. Vale
- 1994 Coach as Naomi
- 1994 Duckman as Additional Voices
- 1994 Dream On as Lauren
- 1993–1999 The Nanny as Dotty
- 1993 The Tower as Gretchen Wallace
- 1992 A Murderous Affair: The Carolyn Warmus Story as Linda Viana
- 1992 Sibs as Mary
- 1991 Howie and Rose as Rita Haber
- 1990 Roseanne as Karen
- 1990 Midnight Ride as Receptionist
- 1989–1991 Empty Nest as Dana
- 1989 Just the Ten of Us as Waitress
- 1989 Do You Know the Muffin Man? as Helen Wells
- 1989 Skin Deep as Bernice Fedderman
- 1989 Communion as Mrs. Greenberg
- 1988 Divided We Stand
- 1987 Night Court as Mandy
- 1987 Roses Are for the Rich as Carrie
- 1987 Hunter as Desk Clerk (episode "Straight to the Heart")
- 1987 My Sister Sam as Marilyn
- 1987 The Underachievers as Female Agent 1
- 1986 Ferris Bueller's Day Off as Bus Driver
- 1986 You Again? as Passerby
- 1985 Once Bitten as Laundromat Lady
- 1985 Heart of a Champion: The Ray Mancini Story as Female Reporter
- 1985 Wildside as Fake Annie Oakley
- 1985 A Bunny's Tale as Hazel
- 1984 Simon & Simon as Doris
- 1984 Hotel as Jean Burke
- 1984 Airwolf as Mona Kahn
- 1984 Empire
- 1983 Remington Steele as Charlene
- 1983 Three's Company as Dee Dee, The Waitress
- 1982 Games Mother Never Taught You as Rita
- 1982 Madame's Place as Fatima
- 1980 The Scarlett O'Hara War as Phoebe
- 1976 Chico and the Man as Nurse Patricia Villa
- 1976 Cousins
- 1973 Could This Be Love as Renee
