= Rafferty (TV series) =

- Genre: Medical drama
- Created by: James Lee
- Starring: Patrick McGoohan; John Getz; Millie Slavin
- Theme music composer: Leonard Rosenman
- Country of origin: United States
- Original language: English
- No. of seasons: 1
- No. of episodes: 13 (3 unaired)

Production
- Executive producer: Jerry Thorpe
- Producers: Norman S. Powell; Robert van Scoyk
- Camera setup: Single-camera
- Running time: 60 minutes
- Production company: Warner Bros. Television

Original release
- Network: CBS
- Release: September 5 – November 28, 1977

Rafferty is an American medical drama series starring Patrick McGoohan that aired on CBS from September 28 until November 28, 1977. McGoohan played a former army doctor named Sid Rafferty who has retired and moved into private practice. Also seen regularly were John Getz as Rafferty's junior partner, Dr. Daniel Gentry, and Millie Slavin as the medical office's nurse, Vera Wales. Episodes often dealt with the gruff, egotistical and driven Rafferty, a brilliant diagnostician with almost no social skills or bedside manner, working to identify his patients' unusual and life-threatening ailments. One reviewer considers this series a forerunner to House, M.D.

It only lasted one season for 10 out of 13 episodes, and McGoohan was apparently very unhappy with the series, reportedly saying: "...a disaster ... the most miserable job I've ever done in my life ... a total frustration from start to finish.."

== Cast ==
- Patrick McGoohan as Dr. Sid Rafferty
- John Getz as Dr. Daniel Gentry
- Millie Slavin as Nurse Vera Wales

== Episodes ==
No.	Title	Directed by	Written by	Original release date
1	"Pilot"	Jerry Thorpe	James Lee	September 5, 1977
2	"Brothers and Sons"	Barry Crane	S : Jerry De Bono; T : Arthur Heinemann & James Lee	September 12, 1977
3	"A Point of View"	Alexander Singer	James Lee	September 19, 1977
4	"The Cutting Edge"	Barry Crane	John Meredyth Lucas	September 26, 1977
5	"The Narrow Thread"	Barry Crane	Unknown	October 3, 1977
6	"The Epidemic"	Barry Crane	David P. Lewis	October 17, 1977
7	"The Wild Child"	Patrick McGoohan	Sue Milburn	October 31, 1977
8	"The Will to Live"	Edward H. Feldman	S : Arthur Joel Katz; S/T : Sue Milburn	November 7, 1977
9	"Walking Wounded"	Arnold Laven	James Lee	November 14, 1977
10	"Death Out of a Blue Sky"	Barry Crane	Robert Van Scoyk	November 28, 1977
11	"No Yesterday and No Tomorrow"	Arnold Laven	S : Rift Fournier; T : James Menzies	N/A
12	"The Price of Pain"	Arnold Laven	S : Rift Fournier; T : James Menzies & John Meredyth Lucas	N/A
13	"The Burning Man"	Barry Crane	Sue Milburn	N/A

== Cultural impact ==
The lyrics of the single "Sleeping Gas" by the post-punk band The Teardrop Explodes express displeasure at the series: "You can watch Rafferty turn into a serial / Just like a cartoon by a.a.p."
