= Moviola (novel) =

1979 novel by Garson Kanin

- First edition
- Author: Garson Kanin
- Language: English
- Publisher: Simon & Schuster
- Publication date: 1979
- ISBN: 0-671-24822-7 (first edition)
- Dewey Decimal: 813.54
- LC Class: PZ3.K137 Mo

Moviola is a 1979 novel, published by Simon & Schuster, by writer-director Garson Kanin.

The novel tells the fictional story of Ben Farber, an immigrant who arrives in Hollywood at the beginning of its Golden Era. Farber narrates the story of his life, interwoven with the legendary events and people that made Hollywood the Movie Capital of the World. Farber's story involves interaction with Greta Garbo, interaction with David and Myron Selznick during the talent search for the perfect Scarlett O'Hara, and experiences relating to the discovery of Marilyn Monroe, among other people and events.

Moviola was subsequently adapted into a three-part miniseries for NBC in 1980; the episodes have also been distributed as stand-alone TV movies. They are:

- The Silent Lovers
- This Year's Blonde
- The Scarlett O'Hara War

== Sources ==
- Kanin, Garson (1979). Moviola. New York: Simon & Schuster. ISBN 0-671-82794-4.
