= The Clock (TV series) =

American TV suspense anthology series (1949–1952)

The Clock is a 30-minute American suspense anthology television series that was broadcast on NBC May 16, 1949 - August 31, 1951, and on ABC October 17, 1951 - January 9, 1952.

The program was based on the American Broadcasting Company radio series of the same name (1946-1948). Larry Semon narrated episodes, most of which were original dramas presented live. A consistent theme in the series was prominent featuring of a clock, with each episode (often related to murder or insanity) having time as a key element. The show's musical theme was "The Sands of Time".

Each week a new set of guest stars was featured. They included Grace Kelly, Eva Marie Saint, Charlton Heston, Cloris Leachman, Raymond Massey, Jackie Cooper, Leslie Nielsen, Robert Sterling, George Reeves, Jack Albertson and Anna Lee.

== Production ==
Among the program's directors was Fred Coe, one of the pioneering producers in the Golden Age of Television.

The show was initially broadcast on Mondays from 8:30 to 9 p.m. Eastern Time; in August 1949 it was moved to Wednesdays at that same time. In April 1950 it was moved to Fridays from 9:30 to 10 p.m. E. T., and in July 1951 it was moved to Fridays from 8:30 to 9 p.m. E. T. On ABC it was broadcast on Wednesdays from 9:30 to 10 p.m. E. T.
