= The Rakamonie EP =

EP by Robyn
- Released: 26 November 2006
- Genre: Pop
- Length: 16:28 (Europe); 17:12 (US)
- Label: Konichiwa
- Producers: Klas Åhlund; Teddybears; Björn Yttling; Kleerup

Robyn chronology
Det bästa med Robyn (2006)	The Rakamonie EP (2006)	The Cherrytree Sessions (2009)

Professional ratings
Review scores
Source	Rating
AllMusic	4/5 stars
Pitchfork	7.8/10
Stylus Magazine	B+

The Rakamonie EP is an EP by the Swedish pop singer Robyn. It was released by Konichiwa Records on 26 November 2006 in Europe prior to the United Kingdom release of her fourth album Robyn (2007). It was released in the United States with a slightly altered track list, which includes an acoustic version of the number 1 UK single "With Every Heartbeat".

== Track listing ==
European release

1. "Konichiwa Bitches" (with "Tomteverkstan" intro) – 3:03
2. "Cobrastyle" (Teddybears cover) – 4:10
3. "List of Demands" (Saul Williams cover) (live with Jenny Wilson) – 2:52
4. "Be Mine!" (ballad version) – 4:08
5. "Jack U Off" (Prince cover) – 2:15

US release

1. "Konichiwa Bitches" (with "Tomteverkstan" intro) – 3:03
2. "Cobrastyle" (Teddybears cover) – 4:10
3. "Be Mine!" (ballad version) – 4:08
4. "With Every Heartbeat" (acoustic version) – 3:32
5. "Jack U Off" (Prince cover) – 2:15

== Personnel ==
The following people contributed to The Rakamonie EP:

- Robyn – lead vocals, mixing, photography
- Klas Åhlund – mixing, string arrangements
- Jenny Wilson – vocals
- Michael Ilbert, Linus Larsson, Henrik, Ollie – mixing
- Frippe Jonsäter, Ljunligan – sound effects
- Mary Fagot for Outfit – art direction
- Blake E. Marquis – art design

== Release history ==
Region	Date	Format	Label	Ref.
Europe	20 November 2006	CD	Konichiwa	
United States	29 January 2008	CD	Konichiwa; Cherrytree; Interscope	
