= Dream On (Christian Falk song) =

2006 song by Christian Falk

Single by Christian Falk featuring Robyn and Ola Salo

from the album People Say and Robyn
- Written: 2006
- Released: 5 May 2006
- Genre: Electropop; dance-pop
- Length: 3:10
- Label: Bonnier Music
- Songwriters: Christian Falk; Robyn; Klas Åhlund
- Producer: Christian Falk

Robyn singles chronology
"Cobrastyle" (2008)	"Dream On" (2006)	"Caesar" (2010)

Robyn British singles chronology
"Who's That Girl" (2008)	"Dream On" (2008)	"Dancing on My Own" (2010)

Alternative covers
- UK CD single cover

Music video
- "Dream On" on YouTube

"Dream On" is a song written by Christian Falk, Robyn, and Klas Åhlund. The song is produced and performed by Falk, with vocals from Robyn and The Ark's's Ola Salo. The song appears on Falk's 2006 album People Say and was released as a single in Sweden, and in 2008, it was released in the United Kingdom.

== Release and reception ==
The song was originally released on Christian Falk's second album People Say in 2006, and was released as a single in Sweden. "Dream On" later appeared on the North American release of Robyn without Ola Salo's vocals. Robyn was re-released in a number of territories with the addition of "Dream On". It was the lead single from the UK special edition of the album. In a November 2008 interview with Digital Spy, Robyn said that while the song was written in 2006, "these lyrics make a lot of sense now. The lyrics are about anyone who's a little bit on the outside - it doesn't have to be thugs, criminals, drug addicts or crazy people [...] It's about how people who are different in society are often discriminated against or bullied."

Digital Spy called the song "a lovely, melancholy piece of electropop that maintains the high standards Robyn set with 'Be Mine', 'Who's That Girl' and 'With Every Heartbeat'." The song has been named a "slice of credible dance-pop, one that combines genuinely heartfelt lyrics [...] with stirring strings and a hands in the air, tripping off your tits chorus." Pitchfork Media said that "Falk [...] concocts a gorgeous, shimmering backing track upon which Robyn and the Ark's Ola Salo rest their weary heads." A later review praised Robyn's "throaty, tremulous performance" as "verging on the evangelical as it crowds out everything else" - the "looped breakbeat, trembling electroclash bass, and winsome synth arpeggios", which Pitchfork described as a "pretty, bittersweet background to Robyn's sermonizing lyrics." Pitchfork placed it at number ten on their Top 100 Songs of 2006.

== Music video ==
=== First version ===
The original music video for "Dream On" was directed by Tobias Annerhult and Fredrik Skogkvist. As opposed to Robyn and Salo appearing in the music video, two students from a high school in Stockholm star. The video opens with Christian Falk and his daughter lying on a bed together, flipping through a book. They stop at a page which is filled with an illustration of two persons walking through a forest. The video then cuts to this scene. They continue walking through the forest while singing. There are interpolated shots of various things: trees with spray painted images, jackets and t-shirts with images moving across them, shadows falling on the trees, drawings in the dirt, and so on. At the end of the video, they both look up to the sky. Shadows of birds flying are seen upon the trees, and the video ends.

- Directors: Tobias Annerhult and Fredrik Skogkvist
- Editor: Tobias Annerhult
- Camera: Kenneth Svedlund
- Hair/Make-up: Erika Svedjevik for Mikas
- Styling: Jenny S.
- Telecine: Anikka Pehrson for STOPP
- Production Company: Mulufilm

=== Second version ===
Like "Handle Me" and "Be Mine!", Robyn recorded a brand new video for the international release of "Dream On". The video was added to Data Records' official YouTube account on 17 October 2008. It begins with footage of the daytime rush hour in metropolitan New York City. Robyn is then shown in a gold Laitinen dress singing while various images from New York at nighttime are shown. She is also shown in a black blazer and white turtleneck as she sings in front of daytime images. A number of people who seem to be in trouble or under stress are also shown: a hooded African American male standing in an alley under police lights, a woman crying while a man pulling on a shirt moves away from her, implying that she is a prostitute, a man yelling and chasing somebody down a street. As the video goes on, it turns out that good things are actually happening to the characters. The camera pans out on the African American man as he slowly pulls down his hood, and it turns out he is actually a police officer. The woman is crying because her boyfriend proposed to her, and he is awaiting her answer. She eventually smiles at him and says yes. The man running down the street was actually saving his target from an oncoming taxicab that would have hit him. Near the end of the video, various characters (such as the man being saved from the taxi, and the girl's reflection) transform into Robyn for a moment.

Like the music video for Oasis' "Stand By Me", the video is based on a famous series of adverts for The Guardian. Entitled The Whole Picture, the adverts showed people appearing to be engaging in criminal and/or anti-social acts yet they are actually helping someone else.

== Track listings ==
=== Swedish single ===
CD single

1. "Dream On" - 3:10
2. "Dream On" (Instrumental) - 3:09

=== UK single ===
2-track single

1. "Dream On" — 2:53
2. "Dream On" (Wez Clarke Edit) — 2:45

Maxi single

1. "Dream On" — 2:52
2. "Dream On" (Wez Clarke Remix) — 7:19
3. "Dream On" (Moto Blanco Vocal Mix) — 8:23
4. "Dream On" (Tiger Stripes Remix) — 6:06
5. "Dream On" (Ashley Beedle's Insomniac Ballroom Vocal Recall) — 7:15
6. "Dream On" (Mr Virgo Remix) — 5:19
7. "Dream On" (Music Video)

12-inch single

Side A

1. "Dream On" (Wez Clarke Remix) — 7:19
2. "Dream On" (Moto Blanco Vocal Mix) — 8:23

Side B

1. "Dream On" (Ashley Beedle's Insomniac Ballroom Vocal Recall) — 7:15
2. "Dream On" (Tiger Stripes Remix) — 6:06

== Credits and personnel ==
- Vocals performed by Robyn and Ola Salo
- Cello performed by Cecilia Linné
- Percussion performed by Christian Falk and Kleerup
- Strings arranged by Carl Bagge
- Synthesizer performed by Pål Svenre
- Viola performed by Hanna Ekström
- Violin performed by Johanna Tafvelin and Karin Liljenberg

=== Production ===
- Lyrics by Klas Åhlund
- Music by Christian Falk, Robyn, and Klas Åhlund
- Produced by Christian Falk
- Mastered by Peter Doell
- Mixed by Ronnie Lahti (additional mixing by Ollie Olson)
- Recorded by Christian Falk and Jacob Myrman
- Published by EMI Music Publishing/Sony Music Publishing

== Chart performance ==
"Dream On" spent three weeks on the Swedish singles chart in 2006, entering the charts at number 46 and peaking four places higher, at number 42. On 23 November 2008, the song entered the UK Singles Chart at number 29.

== Charts ==
Chart (2006–2009)	Peak position
Belgium (Ultratip Bubbling Under Flanders)	3
Scotland Singles (Official Charts)	16
Sweden (Sverigetopplistan)	42
UK Singles (Official Charts)	29
UK Dance (Official Charts)	2

== Release history ==
Region	Date	Format	Label	Catalogue	Ref(s).
Sweden	5 May 2006	CD single	Bonnier Music	334 22831	
United Kingdom	17 November 2008	Digital download	Data	—N/a	
United Kingdom	17 November 2008	CD single	Data	DATA208CD	
United Kingdom	17 November 2008	LP	Data	DATA208T	
