= With Every Heartbeat =

2007 single by Kleerup and Robyn

- First release cover art

Single by Kleerup and Robyn

from the album Robyn (international edition) and Kleerup
- B-side: "Konichiwa Bitches"
- Written: Summer 2005
- Released: 10 January 2007
- Genre: Eurodisco; electro house; electropop; dance-pop
- Length: 4:13
- Label: Risky Dazzle, Virgin; Konichiwa
- Songwriters: Robin Carlsson; Andreas Kleerup
- Producer: Kleerup

Kleerup singles chronology
"With Every Heartbeat" (2007)	"Longing for Lullabies" (2008)

Robyn singles chronology
"Who's That Girl" (2005)	"With Every Heartbeat" (2007)	"Konichiwa Bitches" (2007)

Robyn US singles chronology
"Do You Really Want Me (Show Respect)" (1998)	"With Every Heartbeat" (2008)	"Handle Me" (2008)

Audio sample
- Composed in the key of D major, and set in common time: file; help

Music video
- "With Every Heartbeat" on YouTube

"With Every Heartbeat" is a song by Swedish record producer Kleerup and Swedish singer-songwriter Robyn. It was first released on 7" vinyl on the imprint Risky Dazzle of the legendary Swedish indie label Service in the winter 2006-2007, later on CD single by Virgin on 10 January 2007 in Sweden and later on 30 July 2007 in the United Kingdom. It was released as the second single from the international edition of Robyn's self-titled fourth studio album and the lead single from Kleerup's self-titled debut studio album.

"With Every Heartbeat" peaked at number 23 on the Swedish Singles Chart. Outside Sweden, "With Every Heartbeat" topped the charts in the United Kingdom and peaked within the top ten of the charts in Belgium, Denmark and the Netherlands. In the United States, where it was released as Robyn's first single since "Do You Really Want Me (Show Respect)" in 1998, the single peaked at number twenty-eight on Billboard's Hot Singles Sales chart.

== Background and composition ==
In mid-2006 Kleerup played drums for Klas Åhlund's alternative rock band Teddybears (whose song "Cobrastyle" Robyn covered). Kleerup had a severe nosebleed when he met Robyn through Klas after a gig in Stockholm early one morning, following a massive street brawl downtown between Kleerup, Klas and paparazzi that had insulted Robyn, landing Klas a stint in jail.

According to the singer, it was written in a park in the summer of 2005. The song's melody was inspired by Giorgio Moroder, "but mostly by the ZZ Top song 'Legs'". The song runs for four minutes and thirteen seconds in its entire form. It is composed in the key of D major, and is set in common time. It has an unconventional pop song structure and no distinct chorus. The string parts were originally arranged by Carl Bagge using Sibelius.

A physical single was released in the UK on 6 August 2007. It was named as both Jo Whiley's and Scott Mills's "Record of the Week" and was A-Listed on BBC's Radio 1. Robyn performed the song live on Radio 1 during the Jo Whiley Show on 8 August 2007. It also received strong support by Popjustice, who later ranked the single as the best of 2007.

The song was released in the United States in January 2008. A remix version is also featured in the soundtrack of How to Lose Friends and Alienate People.

== Critical reception ==
Digital Spy's Alex Fletcher gave the song four stars (out of five) and wrote "'With Every Heartbeat' is reminiscent of 90s dance tracks by the likes of Robert Miles. [...] The laid back, coffee-table friendly styling of the track calls to mind Moon Safari era Air, particularly their forgotten classic 'Kelly Watch the Stars'. While the lyrics may be devoid of any emotional clout, they tumble along pleasantly enough while the bleeps and glitches provided by Kleerup nurture your ears."

Steve Perkins of BBC Chart Blog praised the song for its lack of a chorus, writing "when you peel this song apart, it's actually very cyclical regardless: odd lines are repeated, but carefully chosen as if to reinforce the point that a new line just made. [...] There's a trembling quality to Robyn's voice in this song – as though she could fall apart at any moment but is keeping herself together by sheer force of will – which adds enormously to the fighting spirit of a song that is pessimistic without being bleak." Online music magazine Pitchfork placed the song at number 46 on their Top 500 Tracks of the Decade list. In October 2011, NME placed it at number 30 on its list "150 Best Tracks of the Past 15 Years".

== Chart performance ==
"With Every Heartbeat" was Robyn's biggest hit in the United Kingdom, where it topped the UK Singles Chart in August 2007 and became the first number one, second top ten, and fourth top 40 hit of her career in Britain. The song charted inside the top five on downloads alone the week before the song's physical release. As of 2023, the song has sold and streamed 600,000 units in the United Kingdom.

== Music video ==
Two videos were filmed for the song. Kleerup's version shows assorted scenes of life in New York City, while Robyn's version shows the singer walking among colourful building blocks and board game pawns. Robyn wears her trademark neckscarf and stockings, which change colour as the song progresses. The stop motion animation moves in sync with the music. The song pans out halfway through the video to reveal that Robyn is miniature and in fact on a desk in Kleerup's studio. On display in Kleerup's studio is a vinyl copy of Barbra Streisand's album Guilty. The video finishes with the blocks featured in the video tumbling down while Robyn runs away from them, one successfully crushes her. This version of the video is a tribute to the animation of the German artist Oskar Fischinger specifically his work entitled Komposition in Blau.

== Track listing ==
=== Sweden ===
- 7-inch single on Risky Dazzle (a Service imprint)

A1. "With Every Heartbeat"
B1. "With Every Heartbeat Meatboys Remix"

- CD single
1. "With Every Heartbeat" (album version) – 4:06
2. "With Every Heartbeat" (Meatboys Remix) – 4:24
3. "With Every Heartbeat" (Punks Jump Up Remix) – 5:58
4. "With Every Heartbeat" (Rory Phillips Remix) – 6:07

=== United Kingdom ===
- 7-inch single

A1. "With Every Heartbeat"
B1. "Konichiwa Bitches"

- 12-inch single

A1. "With Every Heartbeat" (album version) – 4:10
A2. "With Every Heartbeat" (Tong & Spoon Wonderland Remix) – 7:15
B1. "With Every Heartbeat" (Punks Jump Up Remix) – 5:19
B2. "With Every Heartbeat" (Steve Angello Dub) – 7:12

- CD promo
1. "With Every Heartbeat" (acoustic version) – 3:34
- CD single
1. "With Every Heartbeat" (radio edit) – 3:17
2. "With Every Heartbeat" (Tong & Spoon Wonderland Remix) – 7:17
3. "With Every Heartbeat" (Punks Jump Up Remix) – 5:23
4. "With Every Heartbeat" (album version) – 4:12
5. "Konichiwa Bitches" (video) – 3:06

=== United States ===
- 12-inch promo

A1. "With Every Heartbeat" (Tong & Spoon Wonderland Remix) – 7:15
A2. "With Every Heartbeat" (Corenell Remix) – 6:33
B1. "With Every Heartbeat" (VooDoo & Serano Remix) – 6:12
B2. "With Every Heartbeat" (Punks Jump Up Remix) – 5:21
B3. "With Every Heartbeat" (album version) – 4:13

- Digital download
1. "With Every Heartbeat" (album version) – 4:15
2. "With Every Heartbeat" (Tong & Spoon Wonderland Remix) – 7:14
- Digital download - Joakim Remix
1. "With Every Hearbeat" (Joakim Remix) – 6:46

=== Germany ===
- 12-inch single (Part 1)

A1. "With Every Heartbeat" (Steve Angello Dub)
A2. "With Every Heartbeat" (Hugg & Pepp Remix)
B1. "With Every Heartbeat" (Punks Jump Up Remix)
B2. "With Every Heartbeat" (Kleerup Remix)

- 12-inch single (Part 2)

A1. "With Every Heartbeat" (Corenell Remix)
B1. "With Every Heartbeat" (VooDoo & Serano Remix)

- CD single
1. "With Every Heartbeat" (radio edit) – 3:20
2. "With Every Heartbeat" (album version) – 4:15
3. "With Every Heartbeat" (acoustic version) – 3:37
4. "With Every Heartbeat" (Punks Jump Up Remix) – 5:25
5. "With Every Heartbeat" (VooDoo & Serano Edit) – 6:15
6. "With Every Heartbeat" (Kleerup Remix) – 7:07
7. "With Every Heartbeat" (video) – 4:03

=== Belgium ===
- CD remix maxi-single
1. "With Every Heartbeat" (album version) – 4:13
2. "With Every Heartbeat" (VooDoo & Serano Remix) – 6:14
3. "With Every Heartbeat" (Corenell Remix) – 6:35
4. "With Every Heartbeat" (Kenson Remix) – 7:15
5. "With Every Heartbeat" (Tong & Spoon Wonderland Remix) – 7:17
6. "With Every Heartbeat" (Hugg & Pepp Remix) – 7:04
7. "With Every Heartbeat" (Punks Jump Up Remix) – 5:21
8. "With Every Heartbeat" (Steve Angello Dub) – 7:13
9. "With Every Heartbeat" (Kleerup Remix) – 6:49

== Personnel ==
Personnel adapted from CD single liner notes.

- Music – Robyn, Andreas Kleerup
- Lyrics – Robyn
- Producer – Kleerup
- Violin – Johanna Tafvelin, Karin Liljenberg
- Viola – Ida Nyman
- Cello – Cecilia Linné
- Mixing – Eric Wikstroon, Andreas Kleerup
- Mastering – Björn Engelmann

== Charts ==
=== Weekly charts ===
Chart (2007–2019)	Peak position
Australia (ARIA)	69
Belgium (Ultratop 50 Flanders)	8
Belgium (Ultratip Bubbling Under Wallonia)	2
Czech Republic Airplay (ČNS IFPI)	47
Denmark (Tracklisten)	7
Europe (Eurochart Hot 100)	5
France (SNEP)	30
Germany (GfK)	38
Hungary (Rádiós Top 40)	14
Hungary (Single Top 40)	31
Ireland (IRMA)	15
Italy (FIMI)	12
Netherlands (Dutch Top 40)	7
Netherlands (Single Top 100)	7
Scottish Singles Sales (Official Charts)	1
Sweden (Sverigetopplistan)	23
Switzerland (Schweizer Hitparade)	61
UK Singles (Official Charts)	1
US Dance Airplay (Billboard)	12
US Dance Club Songs (Billboard)	5

=== Year-end charts ===
Chart (2007)	Position
Belgium (Ultratop 50 Flanders)	59
Europe (Eurochart Hot 100)	73
Netherlands (Dutch Top 40)	34
Netherlands (Single Top 40)	66
UK Singles (OCC)	24

Chart (2008)	Position
Sweden (Sverigetopplistan)	53

== Certifications and sales ==
Region	Certification	Certified units/sales
Denmark (IFPI Danmark)	Gold	4,000^{^}
United Kingdom (BPI)	Platinum	600,000^{‡}
^{^} Shipments figures based on certification alone.^{‡} Sales+streaming figures based on certification alone.

== Release history ==
Region	Date	Format
Sweden	5 January 2007	7" single
Sweden	10 January 2007	CD single
United Kingdom	30 July 2007	Digital download
United Kingdom	6 August 2007	CD single
Germany	19 October 2007	CD single
United States	29 January 2008	Digital download
Various	15 July 2016	Digital remix single

== See also ==
- List of UK Singles Chart number ones of the 2000s
