= People Say =

People Say may refer to:

- People Say (album), by Christian Falk
- "People Say" (song), by the Dixie Cups
- "People Say", a song by Don Diablo from Future
- "People Say", a song by The Meters from Rejuvenation
- "People Say", a song by Portugal. The Man from The Satanic Satanist
- "People Say", a song by Wu-Tang Clan from The Saga Continues
