= Robyn (album) =

- Original Swedish cover

Studio album by Robyn
- Released: 27 April 2005
- Recorded: 2004
- Studios: Apmamman, Cosmos Studios (Stockholm)
- Genres: Synth-pop; dance-pop; Europop; indie pop
- Length: 38:12
- Label: Konichiwa
- Producers: Klas Åhlund; Patrik Berger; Kleerup; The Knife; Johan Liljedahl; Teddybears; Fabian "Phat Fabe" Torsson

Robyn chronology
Robyn's Best (2004)	Robyn (2005)	Det bästa med Robyn (2006)

Alternative cover
- International edition

Singles from Robyn
- 1. "Be Mine!" Released: 1 April 2005; 2. "Who's That Girl" Released: 1 July 2005; 3. "Konichiwa Bitches" Released: 23 March 2007; 4. "Handle Me" Released: 24 August 2007

Robyn is the fourth studio album (second internationally released) by Swedish singer Robyn. It was originally released in 2005 in Sweden and Norway only by Konichiwa Records. It was later released in other territories throughout 2007 and 2008. The album represented a departure from Robyn's previous urban and R&B musical style, and explored synth-pop and dance-pop music, with inspirations from electronic duo The Knife and rock band Teddybears. It also marks Robyn's first album release on her own record label, Konichiwa Records, which she founded in 2005.

The album debuted at number one on the Swedish Albums Chart in 2005, becoming Robyn's first-ever number-one album on the chart. The album received a nomination for Best Electronic/Dance Album at the 2009 Grammy Awards. Five singles were released from the album: "Be Mine!", "Who's That Girl", UK number one song "With Every Heartbeat", "Konichiwa Bitches" and "Handle Me".

== Background ==
In 2003, Robyn left her record label, Jive Records, because of the lack of artistic control offered to her by the label. The previous year she had released her third album, Don't Stop the Music, but felt disillusioned by the label's attempt to market her as the next Christina Aguilera in the United States. Robyn described the album as a "big compromise" and was upset because she "was going backwards" and not "doing what [she] wanted to".

That same year, Robyn returned home to Sweden and discovered the electronic music brother-and-sister duo The Knife while browsing through a record store. She became inspired by how the duo self-financed and released their recordings, and bought herself out of her recording contract with Jive Records. She was free from her contract, but did not want to sign with another major label because she felt that "it was totally illogical. Why would I do that? I felt like either I quit making music or I start my own record company". Six months after leaving Jive Records, Robyn founded her own record label, Konichiwa Records, and began recording songs for her fourth album.

Regarding the album's lyrical inspiration, Robyn told Pete Lewis of Blues & Soul in March 2008: "I think the biggest lyrical inspiration for this album was going back to when I was like 15 and on the subway listening to hip hop. Back then—because I didn't know many people in Sweden who knew about rap, it was like my own music world—where the lyrics were very direct. So I tried to return to that age when you're so strong and self-confident, while acknowledging there's also a part of being a teenager when you're sometimes very insecure and feel very fragile."

== Singles ==
"Be Mine!", the album's first single release in Sweden, reached number three and spent nineteen weeks on the Swedish Singles Chart. The song received positive reviews from critics, and was named the fourth best song of 2005 by Stylus Magazine. The second single, "Who's That Girl", reached number thirty-seven in Sweden. Its lyrics discuss the feelings of a female who had been left beaten by the unpredictability of gender and image politics. The songs "Handle Me" and "Crash and Burn Girl" were released as radio-only promotional singles in Sweden and were accompanied by music videos that featured Robyn dancing in a nightclub. "Bum Like You" was released by Dolores Records on a limited edition 7" vinyl and was also featured on the soundtrack for FIFA 08.

The album's lead single in the United Kingdom, "Konichiwa Bitches", received positive reviews from critics due to its "hip-hop sensibilities" and ability to illustrate "the zeal [Robyn] takes in making music". The song received limited airplay and reached number ninety-eight on the UK Singles Chart. "With Every Heartbeat", a collaboration with Kleerup, was released as the second single in the UK. It reached number one on the UK chart, becoming Robyn's most successful single release in the UK. The album's third UK single, "Handle Me", backed by remixes by Soul Seekerz, reached number seventeen. "Be Mine!" was released as the album's fourth single on 14 January 2008, reaching number ten in the UK. "Who's That Girl" was the fifth UK single released from the album on 28 April 2008 and reached number twenty-six. "Dream On" was released on 17 November 2008 as the lead single from the special edition of the Robyn album, peaking at number twenty-nine.

"With Every Heartbeat" was released digitally on 29 January 2008 as the album's lead single in the United States. It was serviced to dance clubs and DJs, eventually reaching number five on Billboard's Hot Dance Club Play chart, as well as number twelve on the Hot Dance Airplay chart. "Handle Me" was released as the second US single on 1 April 2008, reaching number five on the Hot Dance Club Play chart and number four on the Hot Dance Airplay chart. "Cobrastyle", a cover of Teddybears 2004 song, was released as a double A-side single alongside "Konichiwa Bitches" in Australia in September 2007, and peaked at number 17 in Sweden.

== Critical reception ==
Professional ratings
Aggregate scores
Source	Rating
Metacritic	86/100
Review scores
Source	Rating
AllMusic	5/5 stars
Blender	4/5 stars
Entertainment Weekly	A
The Guardian	4/5 stars
MSN Music (Expert Witness)	A−
NME	8/10
Pitchfork	8.2/10
Rolling Stone	3.5/5 stars
Slant Magazine	4/5 stars
Spin	4/5 stars

Upon its release, Robyn received general acclaim from most music critics. At Metacritic, which assigns a rating out of 100 to reviews from mainstream critics, the album received an average score of 86, based on 17 reviews, which indicates "universal acclaim". AllMusic editor Heather Phares called the album "a freewheeling, accomplished pop album that is so fresh that it could pass for a debut", and viewed it as "the pop tour de force that Robyn has always had in her". Chris Willman of Entertainment Weekly graded the album an A, referring to it as "hooky dance-pop greatness" and "[f]antastic all of the time". Barry Walters of Spin stated that Robyn "flashes lyrical smarts that veer between wisecracking sass and heartbroken eloquence", and that the album "achieves the sort of pure pop perfection that her more mainstream records never did." Rolling Stone's Will Hermes concluded, "Sexy without being pandering, arty without being pretentious, Robyn is a public service: a record that can make indie-minded geeks dance without shame." Priya Elan of the NME opined that the album "manages to piece together many of the elements of her chameleon-like career [...] and come up with what is the most inventive pop album you'll hear all year."

Slant Magazine's Sal Cinquemani expressed that the album is "definitely a slow-burner [...], but it's also everything pop music should be: provocative, poignant, inventive, and fun." Daniel Rivera of PopMatters cited the album as Robyn's "most honest and infectious outing to date" and noted that "the most impressive thing about Robyn is just how timeless it is proving to be." Stylus Magazine's Jessica Popper wrote that the album "manages to combine several of the currently popular music genres whilst still making a perfect pop album [...] It's one of the few Europop albums that not only deserves worldwide domination, but also has a really good chance of achieving it." In a review for the Manchester Evening News, Paul Taylor described the album as "undeniably sexy" and dubbed Robyn "a mini-Madonna in the making". Billboard's Jill Menze commended the album for its "sassy and sweet dance pop gems". In his consumer guide for MSN Music, critic Robert Christgau commented that he was "[initially] disoriented by the hype for 'With Every Heartbeat' [...] But without that add-on, which does grow on you the way pop breakthroughs will sometimes, this 2005 EU release might never have materialized here to prepare the way for Robyn 2010". James Hunter of The Village Voice complimented its "fast electro arrangements tending toward the geometric" and found that "[Robyn's] appeal is questionable when she tries to sound like an American rapper, but on tracks where she just sings [...] she gives Europop a swift Swedish energy and presence". Pitchfork reviewer Jess Harvell felt that Robyn's "pop fun is a bit knowing—she's 26 after all. But trust the Swedes. They know what they're doing with this sort of thing."

=== Accolades ===
According to Metacritic, Robyn was the tenth best-reviewed album of 2008, as well as the best-reviewed pop album of the 2000–09 decade. Slant Magazine listed it as the second best album of 2008. Entertainment Weekly ranked it at number four on its list of the 10 Best CDs of 2008, praising Robyn as "an autonomous, thrillingly eccentric dance diva capable of both wrenching techno ballads [...] and saucy, whip-smart kiss-offs". Pitchfork, on its list of the Top 50 Albums of 2005, placed the album at number thirty-nine on its list and hailed Robyn as "one of the best things that happened to music this year that folks on the wrong side of the Atlantic never heard". Pitchfork also included it at number sixty-eight on its list of The Top 200 Albums of the 2000s and stated that "[n]obody [...] made a more lovable pop album this decade than Robyn", describing it as "an indie-as-fuck fairytale: Freed from proto-Mouseketeer teen-pop servitude and inspired by the Knife, Robyn experiments across genres, emotes from the heart, and gradually amasses a netroots fanbase." Aside from critics' lists, the album received a nomination for Best Electronic/Dance Album at the 2009 Grammy Awards, but lost out to Daft Punk's Alive 2007.

Robyn was listed by Pitchfork as the 68th best album of the 2000s, calling it the most "lovable album of the decade".

== Commercial performance ==
Robyn debuted at number one on the Swedish Albums Chart, becoming Robyn's first number-one album in her home country. The album spent thirty-six weeks altogether on the chart, and was certified platinum on 6 April 2006 for shipments in excess of 40,000 copies in Sweden. The album reached the number thirty-five in Norway, and remained on the albums chart for one week. Although the album had charted only in Sweden and Norway, it reached number sixty on the European Top 100 Albums chart on the issue dated 21 May 2005. It became Robyn's first album to chart on the UK Albums Chart, where it debuted at number twenty on 19 August 2007, before climbing to number nineteen the following week. On 13 January 2008, the album re-entered the top forty at number eighteen, and eventually peaked at number eleven three weeks later. On 14 December 2007, Robyn was certified gold by the British Phonographic Industry (BPI), having sold 242,000 copies in the UK as of June 2010. The album reached a new peak position of number forty-eight on the European Top 100 Albums chart dated 16 January 2008.

In 2007, Robyn signed a North American distribution deal with Interscope Records. She was asked by Interscope to include a rapper on the album to highlight its hip hop elements. In an interview with Metro Sweden, Robyn said she understood why the label wants her to include a rapper, but did not want to "work with Akon or some other lame rapper. I want to work with someone who's gangsta, like Snoop [Dogg] or Method Man". Robyn was released in North America on 29 April 2008, entering the Billboard 200 at number 100 with first-week sales of 7,000 copies. It would only spend one week on the chart, and had sold 33,000 copies in the US by June 2010. "Dream On" later appeared on the North American release of Robyn without Ola Salo's vocals.

== Track listing ==
Swedish edition
No.	Title	Lyrics	Music	Producer(s)	Length
1.	"Curriculum Vitae" (featuring Swingfly)	Robyn; Klas Åhlund	K. Åhlund	K. Åhlund	1:53
2.	"Who's That Girl"	Robyn	Robyn; The Knife; Alexander Kronlund	The Knife	3:47
3.	"Handle Me"	K. Åhlund	K. Åhlund	K. Åhlund	3:47
4.	"Robotboy"	K. Åhlund	K. Åhlund; Joakim Åhlund	K. Åhlund	3:31
5.	"Be Mine!"	Robyn; K. Åhlund	K. Åhlund	K. Åhlund	3:27
6.	"Bionic Woman" (Interlude)				0:16
7.	"Crash and Burn Girl"	Robyn; K. Åhlund	Robyn; K. Åhlund	K. Åhlund	3:35
8.	"Tomteverkstan" (Interlude)				0:17
9.	"Konichiwa Bitches"	Robyn; K. Åhlund	Robyn; K. Åhlund	K. Åhlund	2:37
10.	"Bum Like You"	Robyn; K. Åhlund	Robyn; K. Åhlund	K. Åhlund	3:42
11.	"Eclipse"	K. Åhlund	K. Åhlund	K. Åhlund	3:29
12.	"Should Have Known" (new recording)	Robyn; Kronlund	Robyn; Kronlund	Fabian "Phat Fabe" Torsson	3:59
13.	"Anytime You Like"	Robyn	Robyn; Johan Liljedahl; Patrik Berger	Berger; Liljedahl^{[a]}	3:52
Total length:					38:12

International edition
No.	Title	Lyrics	Music	Producer(s)	Length
1.	"Curriculum Vitae" (featuring Swingfly)	Robyn; K. Åhlund	K. Åhlund	K. Åhlund	1:53
2.	"Konichiwa Bitches"	Robyn; K. Åhlund	Robyn; K. Åhlund	K. Åhlund	2:37
3.	"Cobrastyle"	K. Åhlund; J. Åhlund; Patrick Arve; Ewart Brown; Torsson; Troy Rami; David Parker; Sylvia Robinson	K. Åhlund; J. Åhlund; Arve; Brown; Torsson; Rami; Parker; Robinson	Teddybears	4:10
4.	"Handle Me"	K. Åhlund	K. Åhlund	K. Åhlund	3:47
5.	"Bum Like You" (new recording)	Robyn; K. Åhlund	Robyn; K. Åhlund	K. Åhlund	3:28
6.	"Be Mine!"	Robyn; K. Åhlund	K. Åhlund	K. Åhlund	3:27
7.	"With Every Heartbeat" (with Kleerup)	Robyn	Robyn; Andreas Kleerup	Kleerup	4:13
8.	"Who's That Girl"	Robyn	Robyn; The Knife; Kronlund	The Knife	3:47
9.	"Bionic Woman"				0:16
10.	"Crash and Burn Girl"	Robyn; K. Åhlund	Robyn; K. Åhlund	K. Åhlund	3:35
11.	"Robotboy" (new recording)	K. Åhlund	K. Åhlund; J. Åhlund	K. Åhlund	3:31
12.	"Eclipse"	K. Åhlund	K. Åhlund	K. Åhlund	3:29
13.	"Should Have Known" (new recording)	Robyn; Kronlund	Robyn; Kronlund	Torsson	3:59
14.	"Any Time You Like"	Robyn	Robyn; Liljedahl; Berger	Berger; Liljedahl^{[a]}	3:52
Total length:					46:04

UK re-release and Australian edition bonus track
No.	Title	Lyrics	Music	Producer(s)	Length
15.	"Jack U Off"	Prince	Prince	Berger; Liljedahl^{[a]}	2:16

US edition bonus tracks
No.	Title	Lyrics	Music	Producer(s)	Length
15.	"Dream On"	K. Åhlund	Robyn; Christian Falk; K. Åhlund	Falk	3:15
16.	"Handle Me" (RedOne Remix)	K. Åhlund	K. Åhlund	K. Åhlund	4:09

US Digital bonus track
No.	Title	Lyrics	Music	Producer(s)	Length
17.	"Bum Like You" (Alt. Version)	Robyn; K. Åhlund	Robyn; K. Åhlund	K. Åhlund	3:39

US Borders limited edition bonus track
No.	Title	Lyrics	Music	Producer(s)	Length
16.	"Robotboy" (Alternate Version)	K. Åhlund	K. Åhlund; J. Åhlund	K. Åhlund	3:28

European special edition bonus track
No.	Title	Lyrics	Music	Producer(s)	Length
15.	"Dream On" (New Version)	K. Åhlund	Robyn; Falk; K. Åhlund	Falk	3:14

European special edition bonus DVD
No.	Title	Director(s)	Length
1.	"Konichiwa Bitches" (video)	Johan Sandberg and Henrik Timonen
2.	"With Every Heartbeat" (with Kleerup) (video)	StyleWar
3.	"Handle Me" (video)	Johan Renck
4.	"Be Mine!" (new version) (video)	Max Vitali
5.	"Be Mine!" (old version) (video)	Lukas Hammar
6.	"Interview"

UK special edition bonus tracks
No.	Title	Lyrics	Music	Producer(s)	Length
15.	"Dream On"	K. Åhlund	Robyn; Falk; K. Åhlund	Falk	3:14
16.	"Keep This Fire Burning" (2008 Mix)	Remee; Robyn; Ulf Lindström; Johan Ekhé	Remee; Robyn; Lindström; Ekhé	Ghost; Robyn	3:41
17.	"Show Me Love" (2008 Mix)	Robyn; Max Martin	Robyn; Martin	Robyn; Markus Jägerstedt	2:29
18.	"Jack U Off"	Prince	Prince	Berger; Liljedahl^{[a]}	2:17

2020 Record Store Day re-release
No.	Title	Lyrics	Music	Producer(s)	Length
1.	"Curriculum Vitae" (featuring Swingfly)	Robyn; K. Åhlund	K. Åhlund	K. Åhlund	1:53
2.	"Konichiwa Bitches"	Robyn; K. Åhlund	Robyn; K. Åhlund	K. Åhlund	2:37
3.	"Cobrastyle"	K. Åhlund; J. Åhlund; Patrick Arve; Ewart Brown; Torsson; Troy Rami; David Parker; Robinson	K. Åhlund; J. Åhlund; Arve; Brown; Torsson; Rami; Parker; Robinson	Teddybears	4:10
4.	"Handle Me"	K. Åhlund	K. Åhlund	K. Åhlund	3:47
5.	"Bum Like You" (new recording)	Robyn; K. Åhlund	Robyn; K. Åhlund	K. Åhlund	3:28
6.	"Be Mine!"	Robyn; K. Åhlund	K. Åhlund	K. Åhlund	3:27
7.	"With Every Heartbeat" (with Kleerup)	Robyn	Robyn; Kleerup	Kleerup	4:13
8.	"Who's That Girl"	Robyn	Robyn; The Knife; Kronlund	The Knife	3:47
9.	"Dream On"	K. Åhlund	Robyn; Falk; K. Åhlund	Falk	3:15
10.	"Bionic Woman"				0:16
11.	"Crash and Burn Girl"	Robyn; K. Åhlund	Robyn; K. Åhlund	K. Åhlund	3:35
12.	"Robotboy"	K. Åhlund	K. Åhlund; J. Åhlund	K. Åhlund	3:31
13.	"Eclipse"	K. Åhlund	K. Åhlund	K. Åhlund	3:29
14.	"Should Have Known" (new recording)	Robyn; Kronlund	Robyn; Kronlund	Torsson	3:59
15.	"Any Time You Like"	Robyn	Robyn; Liljedahl; Berger	Berger; Liljedahl^{[a]}	3:52
16.	"Jack U Off"	Prince	Prince	Berger; Liljedahl^{[a]}	2:17

Notes

- ^{^a} signifies a co-producer

== Personnel ==
Credits adapted from the liner notes of Robyn.

- Robyn – lead vocals, backing vocals, drums, mixing
- Klas Åhlund – engineering, mixing, production, string arrangements
- Christoffer Berg – mixing
- Patrik Berger – mixing, production
- Cass Bird – photography (international edition)
- Björn Engelmann – mastering
- Mary Fagot – art direction (international edition)
- Janne Hansson – mixing
- Mattias Helldén – cello
- Henrik – mixing
- Örjan Högberg – violin
- Michael Ilbert – mixing, vocal mix
- Frippe Jonsäter – sound effects
- Andreas Kleerup – mixing, production
- The Knife – production
- Johan Liljedahl – co-production, mixing
- Karin Liljenberg – violin
- Cecilia Linné – cello
- Ljunligan – sound effects
- Blake E. Marquis – design (international edition)
- Joakim Milder – string arrangements
- New® – artwork (Swedish edition)
- Ida Nyman – viola
- Malin Ny-Nilsson – viola
- Ollie – mixing
- Georg Riedel – upright bass
- Frederik Skogkvist – photography (Swedish edition)
- Johanna Tafvelin – violin
- Teddybears – mixing, production
- Fabian "Phat Fabe" Torsson – mixing, production
- Erik Wikström – mixing
- Björn Yttling – grand piano

== Charts ==
=== Weekly charts ===
Chart (2005)	Peak position
Norwegian Albums (VG-lista)	35
Swedish Albums (Sverigetopplistan)	1

Chart (2007–08)	Peak position
Australian Albums (ARIA)	120
Australian Dance Albums (ARIA)	17
Belgian Albums (Ultratop Flanders)	73
Canadian Albums (Billboard)	29
European Albums (Billboard)	48
Irish Albums (IRMA)	77
Scottish Albums (Official Charts)	13
Swiss Albums (Schweizer Hitparade)	52
UK Albums (Official Charts)	11
US Billboard 200	100

=== Year-end charts ===
Chart (2005)	Position
Swedish Albums (Sverigetopplistan)	11

Chart (2008)	Position
UK Albums (OCC)	97

== Certifications ==
Region	Certification	Certified units/sales
Sweden (GLF)	Platinum	60,000^{^}
United Kingdom (BPI)	Gold	242,000
^{^} Shipments figures based on certification alone.

== Release history ==
Region	Date	Edition	Format(s)	Label
Sweden	27 April 2005	Standard	Digital download	Konichiwa
Norway	9 May 2005	Standard	Digital download	Konichiwa
France	2 April 2007	Standard	CD	Konichiwa
United Kingdom	2 April 2007	Standard	CD	Konichiwa; Island
Germany	10 August 2007	Standard	CD	Ministry of Sound
United Kingdom	13 August 2007	Re-release	CD	Konichiwa; Island
Australia	5 October 2007	Standard	CD	Modular
Germany	31 October 2007	Standard	LP	Ministry of Sound
United States	29 April 2008	Standard	CD	Konichiwa; Cherrytree; Interscope
Japan	14 May 2008	Standard	CD	Universal
Germany	29 August 2008	Special	CD	Ministry of Sound
United Kingdom	24 November 2008	Special	CD	Konichiwa; Island
Various	29 August 2020	RSD limited edition	LP	Konichiwa; Island
