= Kleerup (album) =

Studio album by Kleerup
- Released: 19 May 2008
- Recorded: 2007–2008
- Genre: Electropop, synthpop, disco
- Length: 46:28
- Label: Virgin
- Producer: Kleerup

Singles from Kleerup
- 1. "With Every Heartbeat" Released: 15 January 2007; 2. "Longing for Lullabies" Released: 21 March 2008; 3. "3AM" Released: 25 August 2008

Alternative cover
- International cover

Professional ratings
Aggregate scores
Source	Rating
Metacritic	69/100
Review scores
Source	Rating
Allmusic	4/5 stars
Digital Spy	4/5 stars
musicOMH	3/5 stars
The Observer	3/5 stars
Pitchfork Media	7.7/10
Popmatters	5/10 discs
Q	3/5 stars
Slant Magazine	4/5 stars
Spin	(7/10)

Kleerup is the debut album by Swedish recording artist and producer Kleerup, released in Sweden on 21 May 2008 by Virgin Records. Following the success of his collaboration with fellow Swede Robyn on 2007's "With Every Heartbeat", the album debuted and peaked at number seven on the Swedish Albums Chart. A revised edition of the album was released internationally in mid-2009.

"Thank You for Nothing" is an alternative, almost instrumental version of Cyndi Lauper's song "Lay Me Down", produced and co-written by Kleerup and included on Lauper's 2008 album Bring Ya to the Brink. "Until We Bleed" and "3AM" appeared, in altered forms, as B-sides to singles released by their vocalists (Lykke Li and Marit Bergman respectively).

== Track listing ==
=== Swedish edition ===
No.	Title	Writer(s)	Length
1.	"Hero" (with The Sweptaways)	Kleerup	4:22
2.	"Until We Bleed" (with Lykke Li)	Kleerup, Lykke Li, Mikael Karlsson	4:24
3.	"Thank You for Nothing"	Kleerup	3:08
4.	"With Every Heartbeat" (with Robyn)	Robyn, Kleerup	4:12
5.	"Tower of Trellick"	Kleerup	3:46
6.	"Longing for Lullabies" (with Titiyo)	Kleerup, Titiyo Jah, Niclas Frisk	3:49
7.	"Music for Girl" (with Lisa Milberg)	Kleerup, Lisa Milberg	2:41
8.	"Chords"	Kleerup	3:51
9.	"Forever" (with Neneh Cherry)	Kleerup, Neneh Cherry, Cameron McVey	4:09
10.	"3AM" (with Marit Bergman)	Kleerup, Marit Bergman	3:57
11.	"On My Own Again"	Kleerup	3:23
12.	"I Just Want to Make That Sad Boy Smile"	Kleerup	4:46

iTunes bonus track
No.	Title	Writer(s)	Length
13.	"History" (with Linda Sundblad)	Kleerup, Sundblad	4:00

=== International edition ===
No.	Title	Writer(s)	Length
1.	"Hero" (with The Sweptaways)	Kleerup	4:21
2.	"Until We Bleed" (with Lykke Li)	Kleerup, Li, Karlsson	4:24
3.	"Thank You for Nothing"	Kleerup	3:08
4.	"With Every Heartbeat" (with Robyn)	Robyn, Kleerup	4:12
5.	"Tower of Trellick"	Kleerup	3:46
6.	"Longing for Lullabies" (with Titiyo)	Kleerup, Jah, Frisk	3:49
7.	"On My Own Again"	Kleerup	3:20
8.	"Iris"	Kleerup	2:57
9.	"3AM" (with Marit Bergman)	Kleerup, Bergman	3:59
10.	"Ain't No Stopping"	Kleerup	4:31
11.	"Misery"	Kleerup	3:58
12.	"History" (with Linda Sundblad)	Kleerup, Sundblad	4:01
13.	"The End"	Kleerup	3:50
14.	"I Just Want to Make That Sad Boy Smile"	Kleerup	4:46
Total length:			55:02

iTunes bonus tracks
No.	Title	Writer(s)	Length
15.	"Chords"	Kleerup	3:51
16.	"Forever" (with Neneh Cherry)	Kleerup, Cherry, McVey	4:09

== Charts ==
=== Weekly charts ===
Chart (2008–09)	Peak position
Swedish Albums (Sverigetopplistan)	7
UK Dance Albums (OCC)	34

=== Year-end charts ===
Chart (2008)	Position
Swedish Albums (Sverigetopplistan)	60

== Release history ==
Country	Release date	Label	Format
Sweden	19 May 2008	Virgin Records	Digital download
Sweden	21 May 2008	Virgin Records	CD
United Kingdom	25 May 2009	Positiva Records	Digital download
Germany	29 May 2009	EMI	CD, digital download
United Kingdom	1 June 2009	Positiva Records	CD
