= Overload (Voodoo and Serano song) =

Single by Voodoo and Serano
- Released: 11 March 2003
- Genre: Trance
- Length: 3:34 (radio mix)
- Producer(s): Voodoo and Serano

"Overload" is a dance/trance song produced by DJs VooDoo & Serano. It reached number 30 on the UK Singles Chart on its release. Its chorus is similar to the Hungarian song "Tied a Szivem" by Dance4ever.

== Charts ==
Chart performance for "Overload"
Chart (2003)	Peak position
Germany (GfK)	60
UK Singles (OCC)	30
