= Handle Me =

2007 single by Robyn

Single by Robyn

from the album Robyn
- Released: 22 October 2007
- Studio: Apmamman (Stockholm, Sweden)
- Genre: Electropop
- Length: 3:47
- Label: Konichiwa
- Songwriter: Klas Åhlund
- Producer: Klas Åhlund

Robyn singles chronology
"Konichiwa Bitches" (2007)	"Handle Me" (2007)	"Cobrastyle" (2007)

Music video
- "Handle Me" on YouTube

"Handle Me" is a song by Swedish recording artist Robyn, taken from her self-titled fourth studio album. It was written and produced by Klas Åhlund. The song was initially released as a promotional single in Sweden in 2005. It received a proper single release on 22 October 2007, as the album's third international single and fifth overall. It was later released as the second single in the United States on 1 April 2008. The song was described as a feminist anthem about a man who believes he is cool, but Robyn thinks he is not and she wants to tell him that. The song utilizes thudding beats and string instruments, including violas, violins and guitars.

The song received generally positive reviews from critics, who noted its potential of becoming a hit. Commercially, the song reached the top twenty in the United Kingdom and New Zealand. It also peaked at number five on the US Hot Dance Club Songs chart. It charted moderately elsewhere, peaking at number thirty-six in the Flanders region in Belgium, and reaching the lower half on the charts in Ireland, the Netherlands, and Germany. A low budget music video was made for the song for the album's release in Sweden and features Robyn and her friends outside at night. In 2007, Robyn made a new video with director Johan Renck. The clip sees Robyn standing in colored boxes of different shapes and sizes.

== Background ==
"Handle Me" and "Crash and Burn Girl" were released as promotional singles in Sweden, in 2005. "Handle Me" was released via digital download as the album's third single in the United Kingdom and Ireland on 22 October 2007. A CD single was later released in the UK on 29 October 2007, and on 7 March 2008 in Germany. The song was released as the second single from the album in the United States on 1 April 2008. The song was written and produced by Klas Åhlund. In an interview with British newspaper Metro, Robyn spoke about "Handle Me", saying, "It’s a fun song about any guy who thinks he’s really cool but really isn’t and I’ve got to tell him."

== Composition ==
Robyn – "Handle Me"
"Handle Me" is a pop song in which Robyn proclaims that a man can't handle her.

Chris Willman of Entertainment Weekly considered the song "a less nasty but even hookier version of Pink's lounge-lizard-repelling 'U + Ur Hand'." The song begins with thudding beats, accompanied by "serious-sounding" violas and violins. David Hyland of WMUR-TV wrote that it utilizes "cheesy guitar flourishes" in the chorus. Hyland referred it to as a feminist anthem due to the "brutality and directness to the lyrics". He wrote, "Robyn sounds undeniably sweet as she defies and then details the seedy exploits of a controlling bar owner who seeks to be her paramour. She trounces him in a manner we're not accustomed to in normally breezy confines of pop music." Danny Corvini of Australian website Samesame.com.au wrote that the song is about "boyfriends who can’t keep up". In the chorus, Robyn tells the man, "You’re a selfish, narcissistic, psycho-freaking, bootlicking Nazi creep/And you can’t handle me." The North American version of Robyn censors the word "Nazi" by reversing it.

== Reception ==
=== Critical reception ===
Nick Levine of Digital Spy awarded "Handle Me" four out of five stars, and wrote, "[Robyn]'s on rum old form on 'Handle Me', her follow-up tune [to "With Every Heartbeat"], taking it upon herself to put a very arrogant young man in his place." He concluded his review, saying that due to the song's backdrop, beats and blips, "Robyn sounds as if she's been beamed in from Mars. In the best possible way, of course." Talia Kraines of BBC Music wrote that "Jamelia would kill for a ballad as elegant as 'Handle Me'." Dan Cairns of The Sunday Times wrote that it includes the "unforgettable put-down: “You’re a selfish narcissistic psycho freaking bootlicking Nazi creep.” The line comes, it should be noted, at the end of a killer chorus. A killer pop chorus." David Hyland of WMUR-TV wrote, "The record's most striking track is "Handle Me," not only because of it has the potential to be a monster hit, but also because it's an interesting combination of contradictory impulses."

=== Chart performance ===
"Handle Me" debuted at number forty-three on the UK Singles Chart on the issue dated 3 November 2007. The following week, it reached its peak of number seventeen. The song spent a total of eleven weeks on the chart. In New Zealand, the song entered at number thirty-six on the issue dated 10 December 2007. After ascending on the chart for several weeks, the song reached its peak of number nineteen on the issue dated 21 January 2008, and stayed in that position for two weeks. In the United States, "Handle Me" debuted on the Hot Dance Club Songs chart at number forty-nine on the issue dated 24 May 2008. The song steadily ascended during the following weeks and reached its peak of number five on the issue dated 26 July 2008. In the Flanders region in Belgium, the song peaked at number thirty-six and spent four weeks on the chart. "Handle Me" also reached number fifty-seven in Ireland, sixty-seven in the Netherlands, and eighty-six in Germany.

== Music videos ==
Robyn standing in front of colored boxes in the second music video for "Handle Me"

The first music video for "Handle Me" was directed by Fredrik Skogkvist for the album's Swedish release. Speaking of the video, Robyn said, "It's an older video and it was done at a point where all the videos that I made for the album were made here in Sweden. They were made here when the album was first released and were very low budget videos. Which I think is great – I don't mind working with low budget kind of videos." Robyn asked director and singer Johan Renck for advice when she started her own record label. At the time, Robyn said that she "hardly had any money to make music videos – and [Renck] doesn't do low-budget stuff – so he hooked me up with people who could help me out." The video begins with Robyn and a group of people outside at night. Robyn wears a tank top and several gold necklaces around her neck. Other scenes show her wearing a hooded sweatshirt, and others wearing a red dress while bicycling.

In an interview with About.com in February 2008, Robyn explained that the album's UK release in 2007 inspired her to make new music videos for "Handle Me" and "Be Mine!" She enlisted Renck for the new video for "Handle Me" because she wanted a challenge. She said, "I like people I work with to challenge me and that's what I get with Johan. He is unafraid to take risks. Some directors are so focused on their original idea that they freak out as soon as you try something new. They miss out on the possibilities." The clip features various solo shots of Robyn while she is dancing in colored boxes and others showing only her head. Several shots include showing her in silhouette and with various props such as a chair, life jackets and smaller boxes.

The second music video premiered on 9 October 2007. A writer for music website Stereogum praised Robyn for making good videos. The writer said, "This must be why [her eyebrows are] black while the top’s not in this vid for “Handle Me,” one of Robyn's many vid-worthy songs. In it she's doing her “I’m fly” boasting, representing your inability to handle her via breaking out of boxes and jump cuts to her humping a stuffed animal and a dancing ninja. Don't analyze, just enjoy."

== Track listing ==
- Digital download
1. "Handle Me" (Radio Edit) – 3:16
- Digital EP
1. "Handle Me" – 3:47
2. "Handle Me" (Soul Seekerz Extended Mix) – 5:57
3. "Handle Me" (Soul Seekerz Dirty Dub) – 8:27
4. "Handle Me" (Soul Seekerz Radio Edit) – 3:01
5. "Handle Me" (Williams Dub/Instrumental) – 7:33
6. "Handle Me" (Williams Vocal Mix) – 7:32
7. "Handle Me" (OrtzRoka Death to Disco Remix) – 3:47
8. "Handle Me" (Chewy Chocolate Cookies Psycho Freakin' Dub) – 4:53
9. "Handle Me" (Bjorn Remix) – 2:57
- Germany CD single
1. "Handle Me" (Original Radio Edit) – 3:16
2. "Handle Me" (Soul Seekerz Radio Edit) – 3:01
3. "Handle Me" (VooDoo & Serano Radio Edit) – 5:47
4. "Handle Me" (Bjorn Remix) – 2:57
5. "Konichiwa Bitches" (Trentemøller Remix) – 6:25
6. "Handle Me" (Video)
- Germany digital EP
1. "Handle Me" (Original) – 3:16
2. "Handle Me" (Original Radio Edit) – 3:16
3. "Handle Me" (Soul Seekerz Radio Edit) – 3:01
4. "Handle Me" (Soul Seekerz Remix) – 5:57
5. "Handle Me" (Soul Seekerz Dirty Dub) – 8:27
6. "Handle Me" (OrtzRoka Death to Disco Remix) – 3:47
7. "Handle Me" (Williams Dub/Instrumental) – 7:33
8. "Handle Me" (VooDoo & Serano Remix) – 5:46
9. "Handle Me" (VooDoo & Serano Radio Edit) – 2:58
10. "Handle Me" (Bjorn Remix) – 3:00
11. "Handle Me" (Chewy Chocolate Cookies Psycho Freakin' Dub) – 4:58
12. "Handle Me" (Williams Vocal Mix) – 7:33
13. "Handle Me" (Instrumental) – 3:49
- US digital download
1. "Handle Me" – 3:47

== Personnel ==
Personnel are taken from the Robyn album booklet.

- Klas Åhlund – music, lyrics, production, mixing
- Robyn – mixing
- Ollie Olson and Henrik Edenhed – mixing

== Charts ==
Weekly chart performance for "Handle Me"
Chart (2007–2008)	Peak position
Belgium (Ultratop 50 Flanders)	36
European Hot 100 Singles (Billboard)	61
Germany (GfK)	86
Ireland (IRMA)	47
Netherlands (Single Top 100)	67
New Zealand (Recorded Music NZ)	19
Scotland Singles (OCC)	16
UK Singles (OCC)	17
US Dance Club Songs (Billboard)	5

== Release history ==
List of release dates, showing country, formats released, and record label
Country	Release date	Format(s)	Label
Ireland	22 October 2007	Digital download	Island
United Kingdom	22 October 2007	Digital download	Island
Belgium	27 October 2007	Digital EP	Island
United Kingdom	29 October 2007	CD single	Island
Germany	7 March 2008	Digital EP, CD single	Ministry of Sound
United States	1 April 2008	Digital download	Interscope
