= Konichiwa Bitches =

2007 single by Robyn

Single by Robyn

from the album Robyn
- B-side: "Cobrastyle"
- Released: 26 March 2007
- Genre: Electropop; hip hop
- Length: 2:36
- Label: Konichiwa
- Songwriters: Robyn; Klas Åhlund
- Producers: Robyn; Klas Åhlund

Robyn singles chronology
"With Every Heartbeat" (2007)	"Konichiwa Bitches" (2007)	"Handle Me" (2007)

Music video
- "Konichiwa Bitches" on YouTube

"Konichiwa Bitches" is a song by Swedish singer and songwriter Robyn, taken from her self-titled fourth studio album. It was released in the United Kingdom on 26 March 2007 as the first international single from the album. The term "Konichiwa Bitches" originates from a sketch with American comedian Dave Chappelle. The song was met with positive reviews and features a more hip-hop sound than Robyn's previous singles. An accompanying music video premiered in February 2007 and features scenes that are literal representations of the song's lyrics. "Konichiwa Bitches" reached number ninety-eight on the UK Singles Chart and number sixty-seven in Australia. It was featured in the American film R.I.P.D.. A Simlish version called "Bonichita Kitcha" was recorded for The Sims Pet Stories and The Sims 2 IKEA Home Stuff.

== Background and release ==
"Konichiwa Bitches" originates from when Robyn and Klas Åhlund watched Chappelle's Show with Dave Chappelle on Comedy Central. He performed a sketch in which the world's different races tried to decide what famous people belonged to which race. Robyn said, "In the end this member of the group Wu-Tang Clan comes up and they're supposed to decide if he's Asian or black and at the end the Asians get him. He goes up on stage and says 'Koni-chi-WAA Bitches', and it's like the most funny thing I know. It's funny and fiesty [sic] and cool." She chose to name a song after that, and call her own label Konichiwa Records. When writing the song, Robyn recalled that she and Åhlund "were calling each other, hitting each other off with new lines." She said, "It was almost like a competition for a while like who could be the craziest. And we would call each other like, listen to this one!"

The song was released as a CD single in the United Kingdom on 26 March 2007 as the first single from the international 2007 edition of Robyn's self-titled fourth studio album. Fans who had signed up for Robyn's newsletter could also download a remix of the track for free. She said, "It's a version me and Klas Åhlund made in the beginning of the recording of the album, and it's been sitting in his computer until now waiting for somewhere to be played." "Konichiwa Bitches" was also released as a double A-side alongside "Cobrastyle" in Australia. "Konichiwa Bitches" charted at number 153 on the UK Singles Chart in April 2007. On the chart issue dated 11 August 2007, the album's second single, "With Every Heartbeat" debuted at number five and "Konichiwa Bitches" entered the top 100 at number ninety-eight. In Australia, the song peaked at number sixty-seven on the issue dated 24 September 2007.

== Composition and critical reception ==
Robyn – "Konichiwa Bitches"
A sample of "Konichiwa Bitches", featuring Robyn rapping over the hip hop beat.

"Konichiwa Bitches" was written and produced by Robyn and Klas Åhlund. It is a pop song, with "girly" "boyish" and "tomboyish" hip hop elements. The song features Robyn rapping over a "simple, ruthlessly catchy beat", that is "laced with some grin-inducing sound effects and laugh-out-loud lyrical turns." It features lines such as "I'll hammer your toe like a pediatrician / Saw you in half like I'm a magician", and "I'm so very hot that when I rob your mansion/You ain't call the cops you call the fire station."

Ben Norman of About.com described the song as "Ridiculous and weird, yet flawless in every way," and called it "perhaps the most brilliant song of her career." Heather Phares of Allmusic wrote that it has "a title that could very well have been the first thing she said to her old bosses once she got her own label set up." Phares also said that Robyn "sounds equally empowered and irresistible, and doesn't hesitate to tell off labels, trifling boys, or anyone else who stands in the way of what she wants." Michaelangelo Matos of The A.V. Club considered the song "one of the few genuinely funny hip-hop send-ups of recent years." Jess Harvell of Pitchfork wrote, that it "suffers from a bad Dave Chappelle joke title, but redeemed by the fact that it's 2:38 of boasting so compressed you'll play it a million times in a row." Jaime Gill of Yahoo! Music UK called the song "the kind of minimal, oddball pop that Pharrell Williams made before his spectacular loss of form." Aidin Vaziri of San Francisco Chronicle named the song the seventh best pop song of 2008.

== Music video ==
The monkey and Robyn in the music video

The music video for "Konichiwa Bitches" was directed by Johan Sandberg, Fredrik Skogkvist and Henrik Timonen. It premiered via Skogkvist's YouTube account on 12 February 2007. In an interview with British newspaper Metro, Robyn was asked about the costumes in the video, and she said "I liked all of them. I had so much fun doing that video. I did it with my friends and we all dressed up. I kept all the costumes. They’re in my living room right now. It’s a bit chaotic. There was a very beautiful hat shaped like the planet Saturn I wore at a gig, so I’m making my way through them. I’ve got enough costumes for fancy dress parties for the rest of my life."

The video begins with an exterior shot of a playhouse in a pink landscape, with people dressed as trees and clouds standing around it. Inside the house, a monkey in pyjamas is playing the drums while being berated over an oversized foam telephone by Robyn. She demonstrates the kind of beat she requires for her song, and the monkey starts playing the song and a title sequence starts. The video is a literal representation of the lyrics, and features Robyn in different outfits and disguises.

Tamara Anitai of MTV Buzzworthy noted the video's Pee Wee's Playhouse-like theme. Anna Pickard of The Guardian spoke of the video, saying, "Yes, the first time, you will spend the whole time saying, "WHAT?" But then you will watch it another dozen times and it will make your whole life better. Trust me." Aidin Vaziri of San Francisco Chronicle wrote of the video, "More unexpectedly filthy funk from Sweden, this time from a woman who employs a man in a monkey suit as her drummer, favors hot pink bodysuits and isn't afraid to rap."

== Formats and track listings ==
- Australian digital download
1. "Konichiwa Bitches" – 2:38
- Digital EP
1. "Konichiwa Bitches" – 2:38
2. "Konichiwa Bitches" (Menta Remix) – 5:21
3. "Konichiwa Bitches" (Trentemøller Remix) – 6:25
4. "Konichiwa Bitches" (Oscar the Punk Remix) – 5:31
- German digital EP
1. "Konichiwa Bitches" – 2:38
2. "Konichiwa Bitches" (Menta Remix) – 5:21
3. "Konichiwa Bitches" (Trentemøller Remix) – 6:25
4. "Konichiwa Bitches" (Oscar the Punk Remix) – 5:31
5. "Konichiwa Bitches" (Clean Version) – 2:38
- "Konichiwa Bitches" / "Cobrastyle"
1. "Konichiwa Bitches" – 2:38
2. "Cobrastyle" – 4:12
3. "Konichiwa Bitches" (Trentemøller Remix) – 6:25
4. "Cobrastyle" (Muscles Remix) – 3:52

== Credits and personnel ==
- Vocals – Robyn
- Music and lyrics – Robyn and Klas Ahlund
- Production – Robyn and Klas Ahlund
- Mixing – Robyn, Klas Ahlund, Henrik Edenhed and Ollie Olson
- Mastering – Björn Engelman
- Sound effects – Frippe Jonsäter and Ljunligan
- Synthesizers – Klas Ahlund

== Charts ==
Chart (2007–2019)	Peak position
Australia (ARIA) with "Cobrastyle"	67
Hungary (Single Top 40)	30
UK Singles (OCC)	98

== Release history ==
List of release dates, showing country, formats released, and record label
Country	Release date	Format(s)	Label
United Kingdom	26 March 2007	CD single	Konichiwa
Germany	18 June 2007	Digital EP	Ministry of Sound
Belgium	13 August 2007	Digital EP	Universal
Australia	3 September 2007	Digital download	Konichiwa
Australia	15 September 2007	Digital EP	Konichiwa
