= Marit Bergman =

Swedish pop musician

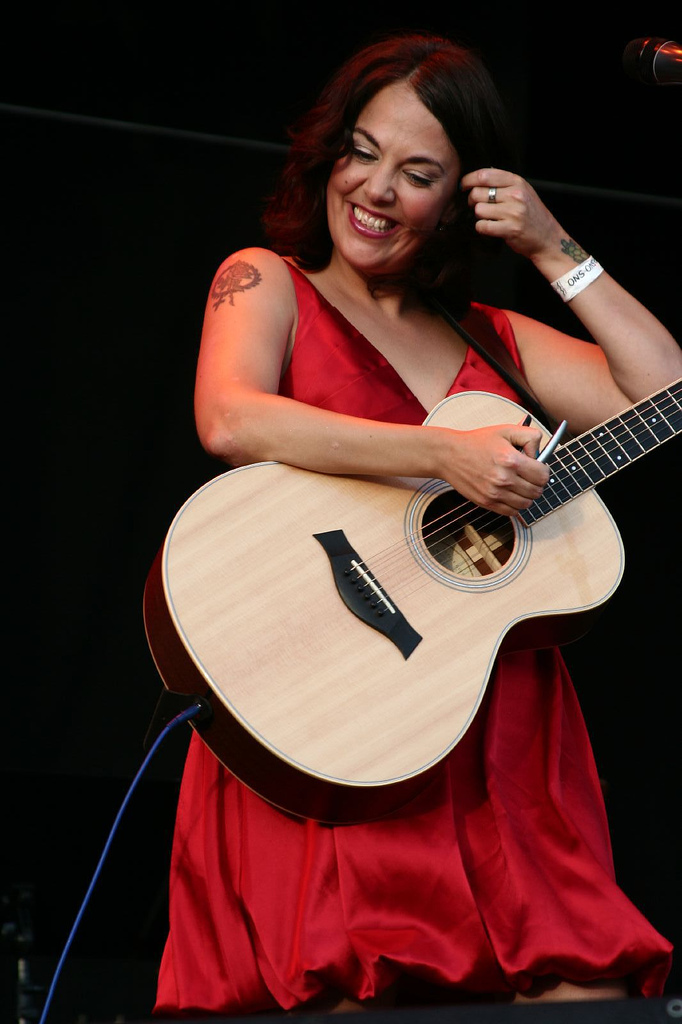
- Bergman during Stockholm Pride 2007

Background information
- Born: Liv-Marit Bergman; 21 May 1975 (age 51)
- Origin: Rättvik, Sweden
- Genre: Pop
- Occupations: Singer, musician, songwriter
- Instruments: Vocals, guitar
- Labels: Sugartoy Recordings, RCA, Sony-BMG, Hypnote
- Website: maritbergman.net

Liv-Marit Bergman (born 21 May 1975) is a Swedish pop musician.

== Biography ==
Marit Bergman grew up in Rättvik, Sweden, and lives in Brooklyn, New York. She was a member of the 1990s Swedish punk band Candysuck. She has also been playing and recording with other musical groups. However, it is as a solo artist that she has risen to national fame, debuting in 2002 with the album 3.00 A.M. Serenades on her own record company Sugartoy Recordings. The record was a success with the critics and was re-released by RCA/BMG in 2003. Björn Yttling of Peter Bjorn and John produced the album.

Her second album, Baby Dry Your Eye, was released in 2004 to critical acclaim and commercial success. It was produced by Marco Manieri. The grand arrangements of its pop songs, in a style sometimes compared to Phil Spector, earned Bergman five Swedish Grammis nominations and two awards – Composer of the Year and Female Artist of the Year. In 2005, a live DVD Live at Rival was released.

In 2006, Bergman released her third solo album, I Think It's a Rainbow. It was produced by Bergman and Yttling and earned five Swedish Grammis nominations.

In 2007, she signed an international deal with US indie label Hypnote, while still keeping a licensing deal for Scandinavia with SonyBMG.

She has been touring in Spain, Italy, Germany, France, Norway, Finland, Poland, Denmark, the US and the UK.

In 2008, she launched a subscription service through her website. She also appeared on Swedish producer Kleerup's self-titled album, contributing vocals to the track "3AM".

Her fourth album, The Tear Collector, was released in March 2009, produced by Marit Bergman. Singers like Frida Hyvönen, Jens Lekman and Larkin Grimm appeared on the album.

In 2011, she took part in a competition called Maestro 2011 arranged by SVT (Swedish Television). She won that competition that had as goal to train the participants to conduct a symphony orchestra.

== Discography ==
=== Albums ===
- 3.00 A.M. Serenades (2002, re-released in 2003) (DNC)
- Baby Dry Your Eye (2004) (#1)
- I Think It's a Rainbow (2006) (#1)
- The Tear Collector (2009) (#14)
- Molnfabriken (2016) (#56)

=== Singles and EPs ===
Year	Single	Chart position	Album
Year	Single	Sweden	Album
2003	"From Now On"	23	EP release
2004	"Adios Amigos" (feat. Cecilia Nordlund)	27	Baby Dry Your Eye
2004	"I Will Always Be Your Soldier"	—	Baby Dry Your Eye
2004	"Can I Keep Him?"	32	EP release
2006	"No Party"	18	I Think It's a Rainbow
2006	"My Love" / "Eyes Were Blue"	—	I Think It's a Rainbow
2007	"Mama, I Remember You Now"	—	I Think It's a Rainbow
2008	"Out on the Piers"	—	The Tear Collector
2008	"300 Slow Days in a Row" (feat. Titiyo)	—	The Tear Collector
2008	"Bang Bang"		The Tear Collector
2008	"3AM" (with Kleerup)	35	Kleerup (Kleerup album)
