= 3AM (Kleerup song) =

Single by Kleerup featuring Marit Bergman

from the album Kleerup
- Released: 25 August 2008
- Recorded: 2007
- Genre: Dance
- Length: 3:57
- Label: EMI
- Songwriters: Kleerup, Bergman
- Producer: Kleerup

Kleerup singles chronology
"Longing for Lullabies" (2008)	"3AM" (2008)

Marit Bergman singles chronology
"All That I Ask of the Morning" (2008)	"3AM" (2008)	"Traveling Companion" (2008)

"3AM" is a song by Swedish producer and singer-songwriter Kleerup, released as the third single from his debut album. "3AM" originally appeared, in a different form, as a B-side to fellow Swede Marit Bergman's single "Mama, I Remember You Now"; she wrote the lyrics and vocal melody for the song, while Kleerup provided an original instrumental for the version that appears on his album.

== Track listing ==
1. "3AM" – 3:57
2. "Throw Your Emotions in the Air" – 4:36
3. "3am (Digital Dog Club Mix) – 6:02

== Chart performance ==
In May 2008, when the album was released, "3AM" charted due to extensive downloading. It charted at No. 52 on the Swedish singles chart, and enjoyed a two-week run.

Upon the singles official release, it re-charted and reached a new peak position of No. 35.

== Chart positions ==
Chart (2008)	Peak Position
Swedish Singles Chart	35
