= Longing for Lullabies =

Single by Kleerup featuring Titiyo

from the album Kleerup
- Released: 31 March 2008
- Recorded: 2007
- Genre: Dance
- Length: 3:49
- Label: EMI
- Songwriter(s): Andreas Kleerup; Titiyo Jah; Niclas Frisk
- Producer(s): Kleerup

Kleerup singles chronology
"With Every Heartbeat" (2007)	"Longing for Lullabies" (2008)	"3AM" (2008)

Titiyo singles chronology
"Lovin' Out of Nothing" (2004)	"Longing for Lullabies" (2008)	"300 Slow Days in a Row" (2008)

Alternative Covers
- International cover

"Longing for Lullabies" is the second single from the Swedish producer and singer-songwriter Kleerup's first album. Following the success of "With Every Heartbeat", released a year before. The single was a top ten hit in Sweden, peaking at No. 7. The song has vocals from Swedish singer Titiyo.

== Chart performance ==
In Sweden, "Longing for Lullabies" entered the official singles chart at No. 16, and climbed to its peak position of No. 7 in the following week, thus giving Kleerup his first domestic top 10 hit, and Titiyo's first top 10 since her 2001 single, "Come Along".

== Track listing ==
1. "Longing for Lullabies"
2. "Longing for Lullabies" (John Dahlbäck Remix)
3. "Tower of Trellick"

== Charts ==
Chart (2008)	Peak position
Denmark (Tracklisten)	10
Poland (Polish Airplay Chart)	1
Sweden (Sverigetopplistan)	7
