= Be Mine! (Robyn song) =

2005 single by Robyn

- 2005 single cover

Single by Robyn

from the album Robyn
- B-side: "Eclipse"; "Jack U Off"
- Released: 1 April 2005
- Studio: Cosmos (Stockholm, Sweden)
- Length: 3:26
- Label: Konichiwa; Ministry of Sound
- Songwriters: Robyn; Klas Åhlund
- Producer: Klas Åhlund

Robyn singles chronology
"Don't Stop the Music" (2003)	"Be Mine!" (2005)	"Who's That Girl" (2005)

Alternative cover
- UK CD single cover

Music video
- "Be Mine!" on YouTube

"Be Mine!" is a song by Swedish recording artist Robyn, written and composed by herself and producer Klas Åhlund for her self-titled fourth studio album (2005). It was released as the album's lead single in Scandinavia in 2005 and released as the fourth single from the album across most European territories in 2008.

The track reached number three on the Swedish Singles Chart, and scored some success in the rest of Scandinavia, peaking within the top twenty in Finland, Norway and the United Kingdom. Released to great critical success, the song was ranked number twenty-one on Pitchfork Media's list of Top 50 Singles of 2005 and number fourth on a same-titled list by Stylus Magazine. The demo was partly influenced by Kate Bush's Cloudbusting.

Remixes of "Be Mine!" were produced by Dusty Kid, Jori Hulkkonen, Meat Boys, Ocelot, Redroche and Roger Sanchez, with a studio live version being featured on Robyn's The Rakamonie EP. The song is performed with piano accompaniment in live acoustic versions by Robyn. The song's chorus was sampled for Rye Rye's 2011 song "Never Will Be Mine", which also features Robyn.

== Music videos ==
Two music videos were produced for the song. The original video of "Be Mine!", directed by Brad Kluck and released in 2005, shows several Robyns (one bald, one a green-haired stripper, one with a bowl-cut and another dishevelled-looking one with white hair) featured in different scenes. Most of the different Robyns self-evaluate their appearance in some way, by looking into mirrors.

A second music video, directed by Max Vitali, was filmed for the 2007 release. It switches between shots of Robyn in a white room and Robyn going to a bar with a friend at night. Fitting with the song's lyrics, Robyn sees her object of infatuation at the bar, who she envisions to be holding her (however, is kissing his girlfriend). The new video for "Be Mine!" was first released on 27 November 2007 and is shown exclusively at Robyn's official website.

== Track listings ==
Swedish CD single (KOR001; Released 1 April 2005)

1. "Be Mine!" – 3:26
2. "Be Mine!" (at Högalid Studio) – 4:10
3. "Jack U Off" – 2:14

UK CD single and iTunes EP (1759899; Released 14 January 2008 [physical] / 11 January 2008 [digital])

1. "Be Mine!" – 3:26
2. "Be Mine!" (Ballad Version) – 4:10
3. "Eclipse" – 3:30
4. "Be Mine!" (Roger Sanchez Remix) – 7:59

UK iTunes single (Released 4 January 2008)

1. "Be Mine!" (Soul Seekerz Club Mix) – 7:38
2. "Be Mine!" (Soul Seekerz Radio Edit) – 3:18

UK iTunes remix EP (Released 14 December 2007)

1. "Be Mine!" (Roger Sanchez Mix) – 8:00
2. "Be Mine!" (Redroche Vocal Mix) – 6:59
3. "Be Mine!" (Ocelot Mthrfckrs Remix) – 6:20
4. "Be Mine!" (Wasted Youth Mix) – 4:31
5. "Be Mine!" (Dusty Kid In the Tunnels Mix) – 7:19
6. "Be Mine!" (Meat Boys Remix) – 4:59
7. "Be Mine!" (Jori Hulkkonen Vocal) – 9:03

GSA enhanced maxi-single (0191336MIN; Released 29 August 2008)

1. "Be Mine!" (Original) – 3:26
2. "Be Mine!" (Plastik Funk Remix) – 6:21
3. "Be Mine!" (Wasted Youth Mix) – 4:34
4. "Be Mine!" (Jori Hulkkonen Vocal Mix) – 9:06
5. "Be Mine!" (Ballad Version) – 4:10
6. "Be Mine!" (Video)

Mark E Remix single

1. "Be Mine!" (Mark E Remix) - 6:00

== Personnel ==
Personnel are adapted from the Robyn liner notes.

- Robyn – lead vocals
- Mattias Helldén – cello
- Joakim Milder, Klas Åhlund – string arrangements
- Michael Ilbert – mixing
- Björn Engelmann – mastering

== Charts ==
=== Weekly charts ===
Chart (2005)	Peak position
Finland (Suomen virallinen lista)	11
Norway (VG-lista)	13
Sweden (Sverigetopplistan)	3

Chart (2008)	Peak position
Austria (Ö3 Austria Top 40)	54
Belgium (Ultratip Bubbling Under Flanders)	23
Europe (European Hot 100 Singles)	36
Germany (GfK)	59
Ireland (IRMA)	35
Romania (Romanian Top 100)	93
Scotland Singles (OCC)	22
Switzerland (Schweizer Hitparade)	65
UK Singles (OCC)	10

=== Year-end charts ===
Chart (2005)	Position
Sweden (Hitlistan)	35

Chart (2008)	Position
UK Singles (OCC)	109
