= Crash and Burn Girl =

Promotional single by Robyn

from the album Robyn
- Released: 2006
- Recorded: 2004
- Genre: Pop; nu-disco
- Length: 3:36
- Label: Konichiwa Records
- Songwriters: Robyn; Klas Åhlund
- Producer: Klas Ahlund

"Crash and Burn Girl" is the fourth single from Swedish pop singer-songwriter Robyn's 2005 self-titled album. It was released in 2006 as a promotional single in Sweden only.

== Music video ==
The music video for "Crash and Burn Girl" features Robyn heading down the stairs in a grey hoodie and shades before beginning to dance in an underground night club. The video is filmed with a night vision camera which was held by Robyn while she danced.

== Track listings ==
=== Scandavian single ===
CD promo

1. "Crash and Burn Girl" – 3:35

=== Sweden single ===
CD promo

1. "Crash and Burn Girl" (Jesper Dahlbäck Remix) – 5:38
2. "Crash and Burn Girl" (Cat5 Remix) – 5:41

== Personnel ==
- Music and lyrics by Robyn and Klas Åhlund.
- Produced by Klas Ahlund.
- Violin performed by Orjan Hogberg.
- Viola performed by Malio Ny-Nilsson.
- Mixed by Ollie Olson och Henrik Edenhed for Mix Inc., Robyn and Klas Åhlund at Ljundhavet Studios.
- Published by Madhouse/BMG Music Publishing.
