= People Say (album) =

Studio album by Christian Falk
- Released: 4 October 2006
- Genre: Dance-pop
- Label: Bonnier
- Producers: Lars Nylin (exec.), Christian Falk

Singles from People Say
- 1. "Dream On" Released: 5 May 2006

People Say is the second studio album by Swedish musician Christian Falk. It was released on 4 October 2006 through Bonnier Music. The album peaked at number 17 on the Swedish Albums Chart.

== Track listing ==
1. "Brighter Days" – 1:40
2. "Dream On" (feat. Robyn & Ola Salo) – 3:09
3. "Mind Elevation" (feat. Demetrius Price) – 3:56
4. "Way Home" – 3:49
5. "Shine" (feat. Pauline) – 3:25
6. "Something Good" (feat. Vanessa Falk) – 3:10
7. "C.C.C." (feat. Robyn) – 4:18
8. "People Say" (feat. Vanessa Falk) – 3:25
9. "My Heart" (feat. Cindy) – 3:02
10. "So So Beautiful" – 2:17

== Charts ==
Chart (2006)	Peak position
Swedish Albums Chart	17
