= Cobrastyle =

2004 song by Teddybears and Mad Cobra

Single by Teddybears featuring Mad Cobra

from the album Fresh and Soft Machine
- Released: 2004
- Genre: Ragga, alternative dance, dance-rock, indietronica
- Length: 2:59
- Label: Big Beat
- Songwriters: Klas Åhlund; Joakim Åhlund; Patrick Arve; Ewart Brown; Fabian Torsson; Troy Rami; Paul Rota; David Parker; Sylvia Robinson

Teddybears featuring Mad Cobra singles chronology
"Yours to Keep" (2004)	"Cobrastyle" (2004)	"Hey Boy" (2004)

Music video
- "Cobrastyle" on YouTube

"Cobrastyle" is a song performed by Swedish band Teddybears, featuring Jamaican singer Mad Cobra. The song uses Mad Cobra’s earlier song “Press Trigger”, released in 2001. The song was released on their 2004 album Fresh, and reissued on their 2006 album Soft Machine. It was released as a single on 6 June 2006.

== Music video ==
The music video for "Cobrastyle" features a stop-motion gorilla and cobra robot attacking each other in front of a mountain range, while Teddybears and Mad Cobra perform the song.

The official music video for "Cobrastyle" features a mixture of retro footage and footage of the band in costume made to look like older recordings.

== Usage in media ==
The song has been featured in the pilot episodes of two American television programs, Chuck and Teen Wolf. It was featured in S1:E2 of the American television miniseries The Dropout. It was also used in the comedy films After the Sunset, Date Night, The Benchwarmers, Employee of the Month, College Road Trip, Don't Hang Up, Diary of a Wimpy Kid, Man of the Year, Rise, Shamlet, the video games FIFA 06, FIFA 23 and Forza Motorsport 2, the trailers for Epic Movie, G-Force and Megamind. and was featured both in a KFC and Sky ad in the UK, as well as an ad for the Volvo FMX and separately another ad featuring the Volvo XC40 Recharge. It was also featured in S3:E6 of Grey's Anatomy.

It was also used for the World Wrestling Entertainment PPV SummerSlam in 2006.

The song was also featured in the 2024 young adult romantic drama film Your Fault (Culpa Tuya) based on the trilogy book series by Mercedes Ron.

== Track listing ==
CD single

1. "Cobrastyle" – 2:59
2. "Cobrastyle" (Instrumental) – 2:59
3. "Cobrastyle" (A capella) – 2:41

== Charts ==
=== Weekly charts ===
Chart (2004–05)	Peak position
Greece (IFPI)	1
Hungary (Editors' Choice Top 40)	34
Sweden (Sverigetopplistan)	10
US Pop 100 (Billboard)	89

=== Year-end charts ===
Chart (2004)	Position
Sweden (Sverigetopplistan)	57

== Robyn version ==
"Cobrastyle"
- Cover of the Australian "Konichiwa Bitches" / "Cobrastyle" single

Single by Robyn

from the album The Rakamonie EP and Robyn (international edition)
- Released: September 15, 2007
- Genre: Dancehall; electropop
- Length: 4:12
- Label: Konichiwa
- Songwriters: Klas Åhlund; Joakim Åhlund; Patrick Arve; Ewart Brown; Fabian Torsson; Troy Rami; Paul Rota; David Parker; Sylvia Robinson
- Producer: Teddybears

Robyn singles chronology
"Handle Me" (2007)	"Cobrastyle" (2007)	"Dream On" (2008)

Music video
- "Cobrastyle" on YouTube

"Cobrastyle" was covered by Swedish singer and songwriter Robyn on her 2006 EP, The Rakamonie EP. The cover was included on the international edition of her self-titled album Robyn. The song was released as a single in Australia in September 2007, as a part of the double A-side single "Konichiwa Bitches" / "Cobrastyle".

=== Promotion ===
Ahead of the October 2007 Australian release of Robyn through Modular Recordings, "Konichiwa Bitches" and "Cobrastyle" were released together as a double A-side single, a month before the album's release. To promote the album and single, Robyn performed two concerts in Australia in mid-September.

In May 2008, Robyn performed the song with the Teddybears on the Late Show with David Letterman and The View.

=== Critical reception ===
Daniel Rivera of PopMatters called Robyn's version "a damn near perfect Teddy Bears cover (easily surpassing the original)", while LA Music Blog thought the song was "futuristic and brilliant". Robyn's cover version was listed as number 61 on Rolling Stone's list of the 100 Best Songs of 2008, who praised the song's "blast of freezy-cool electro that oozes sass."

The New Yorker described "Cobrastyle" as a "fast, chattering electronic track that runs at a punk tempo, except for the moments when it drops in fragments of dancehall rhythms", feeling that Robyn's lyrical delivery was "a mash of language from everywhere and nowhere, and sound decidedly un-Swedish". Stephen M. Deusner of Pitchfork felt her delivery was Robyn "playfully [turning] Mad Cobra's Jamaican patois into a dance nursery rhyme". Prefix Magazine felt that the lyrics of "Cobrastyle" and Robyn in general were "wonderfully dumb throughout...Robyn clearly has a fondness for big empty pop that sounds good but says little", feeling that "it takes a hardened soul to withstand the charms of an album" with lyrics such as "Cobrastyle"'s.

In a mixed review by for GayCalgary Magazine, Rob Diaz-Marino found "Cobrastyle" melodically likable, but "felt like something was being held back".

=== Music videos ===
Two music videos were produced for "Cobrastyle". The first was released on 25 April 2008 as a viral video, and features Robyn and Perez Hilton (among others) playing strip poker. The second was released on 10 October 2008. The video shows Robyn and other musicians dressed in white and set against a white background. As the band performs, graffiti artists cover the scene in paint.

=== Usage in media ===
In 2023, Charli XCX used an interpolation of "Cobrastyle" in her song "Speed Drive" for Barbie the Album.

=== Formats and track listings ===
- "Konichiwa Bitches" / "Cobrastyle"
1. "Konichiwa Bitches" – 2:38
2. "Cobrastyle" – 4:12
3. "Konichiwa Bitches" (Trentemøller remix) – 6:25
4. "Cobrastyle" (Muscles remix) – 3:52
- "Cobrastyle Remixes" (US promo)
1. "Cobrastyle" (Mason remix) – 5:30
2. "Cobrastyle" (Adam K & Soha remix) – 6:42
3. "Cobrastyle" (The Touch remix) – 6:08
4. "Cobrastyle" (Samim remix) – 6:10
5. "Cobrastyle" (The Bloody Beetroots remix) – 4:01
6. "Cobrastyle" (Mason dub) – 5:29
7. "Cobrastyle" (The Bloody Beetroots instrumental) – 4:02

=== Charts ===
Chart (2007–2008)	Peak position
Australia (ARIA); As "Konichiwa Bitches" / "Cobrastyle"	67
Sweden (Sverigetopplistan)	17
US Dance Club Songs (Billboard)	7

=== Release history ===
List of release dates, showing country, formats released, and record label
Country	Release date	Format(s)	Label	Ref.
Australia	15 September 2007	Digital EP, CD single	Konichiwa; Modular	
United States	October 2008	Promotional single	Konichiwa; Cherrytree; Interscope	
