= Who's That Girl (Robyn song) =

Single by Robyn

from the album Robyn
- B-side: "Message in a Bottle"; "Sexual Eruption"
- Released: 29 June 2005 (Sweden); 28 April 2008 (UK)
- Recorded: 2004
- Genre: Electropop
- Length: 3:15 (radio edit); 3:50 (album version)
- Label: Konichiwa
- Songwriters: Robyn; Alexander Kronlund; Karin Dreijer; Olof Dreijer
- Producer: The Knife

Robyn singles chronology
"Be Mine!" (2005)	"Who's That Girl" (2005)	"With Every Heartbeat" (2007)

Music video
- "Who's That Girl" on YouTube

"Who's That Girl" is a song by Swedish pop singer Robyn, written and composed by herself and sibling production duo The Knife for her self-titled fourth studio album (2005). The track was released as the album's second single in Scandinavia in 2005 and fifth UK single on 28 April 2008.

The track became a minor success on the charts, peaking at number thirty-seven on the Swedish Singles Chart, where it was the third biggest hit from the Robyn album there. In the UK, where the single featured remixes by Seamus Haji, Rex the Dog, and Drop the Lime, "Who's That Girl" reached number twenty-six on the UK Singles Chart.

The song was recorded by Yelle as "Qui est cette fille?" as part of the iTunes Foreign Exchange, where Robyn recorded "À cause des garçons" as "Because of Boys".

== Music and lyrics ==
"Who's That Girl" features a "towering and architectural" electropop sound. Lyrically, it "challenges gender expectations - Robyn asks a boyfriend to switch places with her and then asks, "Would you love me any different?" - and expresses frustration about unrealistic pressures on women".

== Music video ==
No video was shot for the Swedish release of the "Who's That Girl" single. A video was shot for the UK release of the song and was directed by Diane Martel. It premiered on YouTube on 8 April 2008.

== Track listing ==
Swedish CD single (2005)

1. "Who's That Girl" (Original Version) – 3:50
2. "Who's That Girl" (Style Of Eye remix) – 6:19

UK digital download (21 April 2008)

1. "Who's That Girl" (Seamus Haji Remix) – 8:10
2. "Who's That Girl" (Rex the Dog Mix) – 8:13
3. "Who's That Girl" (Drop the Lime is That Girl Remix) – 5:09
4. "Who's That Girl" (Seamus Haji Radio Edit) – 4:04
5. "Who's That Girl" (Radio Edit) – 3:15

UK CD single (28 April 2008)

1. "Who's That Girl" (Radio Edit) – 3:22
2. "Message in a Bottle" (Radio 2 Session) – 3:21
3. "Sexual Eruption" (Robyn Remix) (with Snoop Dogg) – 4:25

UK vinyl single (28 April 2008)

1. "Who's That Girl" (Seamus Haji Vocal Mix)
2. "Who's That Girl" (Rex the Dog Mix) – 8:13
3. "Who's That Girl" (Drop the Lime Is That Girl Mix) – 5:09

== Personnel ==
- Music by Robyn, The Knife and Alexander Kronlund
- Produced by The Knife
- Recorded at Cosmos Studios and Apmamman
- Mixed by Christoffer Berg at Music-A-Matic Studios
- Vocal mix by Michael Ilbert at Megaphone Studios
- Published by BMG Music Publishing/Universal Music Publishing

== Charts ==
Chart (2005–2008)	Peak position
Romania (Romanian Top 100)	46
Sweden (Sverigetopplistan)	37
UK Singles (OCC)	26
