= Christian Falk =

Swedish record producer and musician (1962–2014)

Christian Falk (25 April 1962 – 24 July 2014) was a Swedish record producer and musician. Falk started his recording career with the band Madhouse in the early 1980s. He later moved on and became a founding member of post-punk band Imperiet.

In the early 1990s, he emerged as a producer and DJ in the emerging Swedish hip hop, soul and club scene. He switched comfortably between different styles of music; with Papa Dee he did dancehall hip hop, with Stonefunkers it was Daisy Age-inspired hip hop and P-Funk, dancehall with Swing-A-Ling Sound System, R&B and acid jazz with Blacknuss, hip hop with Petter, the Timebomb collective and Timbuktu, hardcore and electro with The Teddybears, and club soul with Kayo, among many others. He also co-wrote the track "Electricity", and several other tracks on the 1995 album We Care from alt-rockers Whale.

He released the hit single "Make It Right" under his own name in 2000, with vocals by Demetrius Price, credited Demetreus. In 2008, he released a new version of "Calling You" with Jevetta Steele's vocals. The cover was released as a single from his album Quel Bordel. In the UK, he enjoyed a Top 40 hit with "Dream On" in 2008, which featured vocals from fellow Swede Robyn. Falk also produced the multi-million selling song "7 Seconds" composed by Youssou N'Dour, Neneh Cherry, Cameron McVey and Jonathan Sharp, released in 1994 as a single performed by Youssou N'Dour and Neneh Cherry.

== Death ==
Falk died on 24 July 2014 from pancreatic cancer, aged 52, in Stockholm.

== Discography ==
=== Albums (in his own name) ===
- Quel Bordel (1999)
- Christian Falk Hosts Swedish Open (2002)
- People Say (2006)

=== Singles ===
- "Make It Right" (featuring Demetreus) (2000) – UK #22
- "Calling You" (featuring Jevetta Steele)
- "Dream On" (featuring Robyn and Ola Salo) (2008) – UK #29

== See also ==
- Robyn & La Bagatelle Magique
