= VooDoo & Serano =

German musical partnership

- Origin: Germany
- Genres: Electronic dance, Trance
- Years active: 1997–present
- Members: DJ VooDoo (aka Reinhard Raith), Tommy Serano

VooDoo & Serano are a duo of DJs and producers/remixers from Germany. They are made up of DJ VooDoo (aka Reinhard Raith) and Tommy Serano.

== Discography ==
=== Albums ===
- Cold Blood (2002)
- Back for More (2004)

=== Charted singles ===
List of singles, with selected chart positions
| Title | Year | Peak chart positions | | |
| Title | Year | GER | AUS | UK |
|---|---|---|---|---|
| "Blood Is Pumpin'" | 2000 | 77 | 51 | 19 |
| "Slide to the Vibe" | 2001 | 84 | — | — |
| "When I Rock" | 2002 | 87 | — | — |
| "Operation Bass/Blood Is Pumpin'" (with Public Domain) | 2003 | — | — | 77 |
| "Overload" | 2003 | 60 | — | 30 |
| "Give Me the Power" | 2003 | 89 | — | — |
| "Sunglasses at Night" | 2009 | 63 | — | — |

=== Other singles ===
- "Kick da Groove" (1997)
- "Welcome to the Space" (1998)
- "This Is Acid" (2001)
- "Blood is Pumpin" (2002)
- "Cold Blood" (2002)
- "This Is Entertainment" (2004)
- "Don't You Know" (2005)
- "Vulnerable" (2006)
- "Dirty" (2006)
- "Transatlantic Blow" (2008)
- "Feel Me" (2010)

=== Remixes ===
- 1998 - DJ Digress - In My Mind
- 1998 - Tommy Serano Feat. DJ Voodoo - Welcome To The Space
- 2001 - Ayumi Hamasaki - Fly High
- 2001 - N-Trance - Forever
- 2001 - N-Trance - Set You Free
- 2001 - Kyau vs. Albert - Outside
- 2001 - JT Company - Wake Me Tonight
- 2002 - Mr. Phillips - 7th Day (I Will Be There)
- 2002 - Ian Van Dahl - Will I?
- 2002 - Gardeweg - All I Want
- 2002 - Warp Brothers - Cokane
- 2002 - Every Little Thing - Forever Yours
- 2002 - Marc Maris vs. Ramone - Eternity
- 2002 - N-Trance - Forever
- 2002 - Hampenberg - Listen Up
- 2002 - DJ Dean - Play It Hard
- 2002 - Green Court Feat. Lina Rafn - Silent Heart
- 2002 - CJ Stone - Into The Sea
- 2002 - Divine Inspiration - The Way (Put Your Hand In My Hand)
- 2003 - QFX - Freedom
- 2003 - DJ Shog - Another World
- 2003 - Voodoo & Serano vs. Bass Bumpers - Music's Got Me
- 2003 - Yomanda - You're Free
- 2003 - Pascal - This Will Be (The Best Days Of Our Lives)
- 2003 - N-Trance - Destiny
- 2003 - Friday Night Posse - Kiss This
- 2003 - Ayumi Hamasaki - Endless Sorrow
- 2003 - CJ Stone - Don't Look Back
- 2003 - Flip & Fill - Field Of Dreams
- 2003 - RMB - Reality
- 2003 - Green Court - Silent Heart
- 2003 - DJ Yanny Pres. Terraformer - Won't Forget These Days
- 2004 - Ultrabeat - Better Than Life
- 2004 - Dance Assassins - Here I Am
- 2004 - N-Trance - I'm In Heaven
- 2005 - P.S. - Der Menschliche Faktor
- 2005 - Potatoheadz Featuring Lizzy Pattinson - Narcotic
- 2006 - Plastik Funk - Gonna Make You Sweat (Everybody Dance Now!)
- 2006 - VooDoo & Serano - Don't You Know
- 2007 - Nena, Olli + Remmler - Ich Kann Nix Dafür
- 2007 - Sublime - The Rain
- 2007 - Robyn with Kleerup - With Every Heartbeat
- 2008 - Robyn - Handle Me
- 2008 - Re-Fuge Ft. Nicole Tyler - So Real
- 2008 - Basshunter - All I Ever Wanted
- 2009 - Anna Grace - You Make Me Feel
- 2009 - Da Hool - Summer
- 2009 - Franky Miller - Jumping
- 2010 - Remady feat. Lumidee & Chase Manhattan - I'm No Superstar
- 2013 - Lumidee vs. Fatman Scoop - Dance!

=== DJ Mixes ===
- 2001 - Viva Ibiza
- 2002 - Techno Club Vol. 16
- 2003 - The Spirit of Space - Ibiza
- 2004 - This Is Trance! 2

== Sources ==
- VooDoo & Serano Discogs
- Voodoo & Serano | Listen and Stream Free Music, Albums, New Releases, Photos, Videos
- Voodoo & Serano Facebook
