= Robyn =

Swedish singer (born 1979)

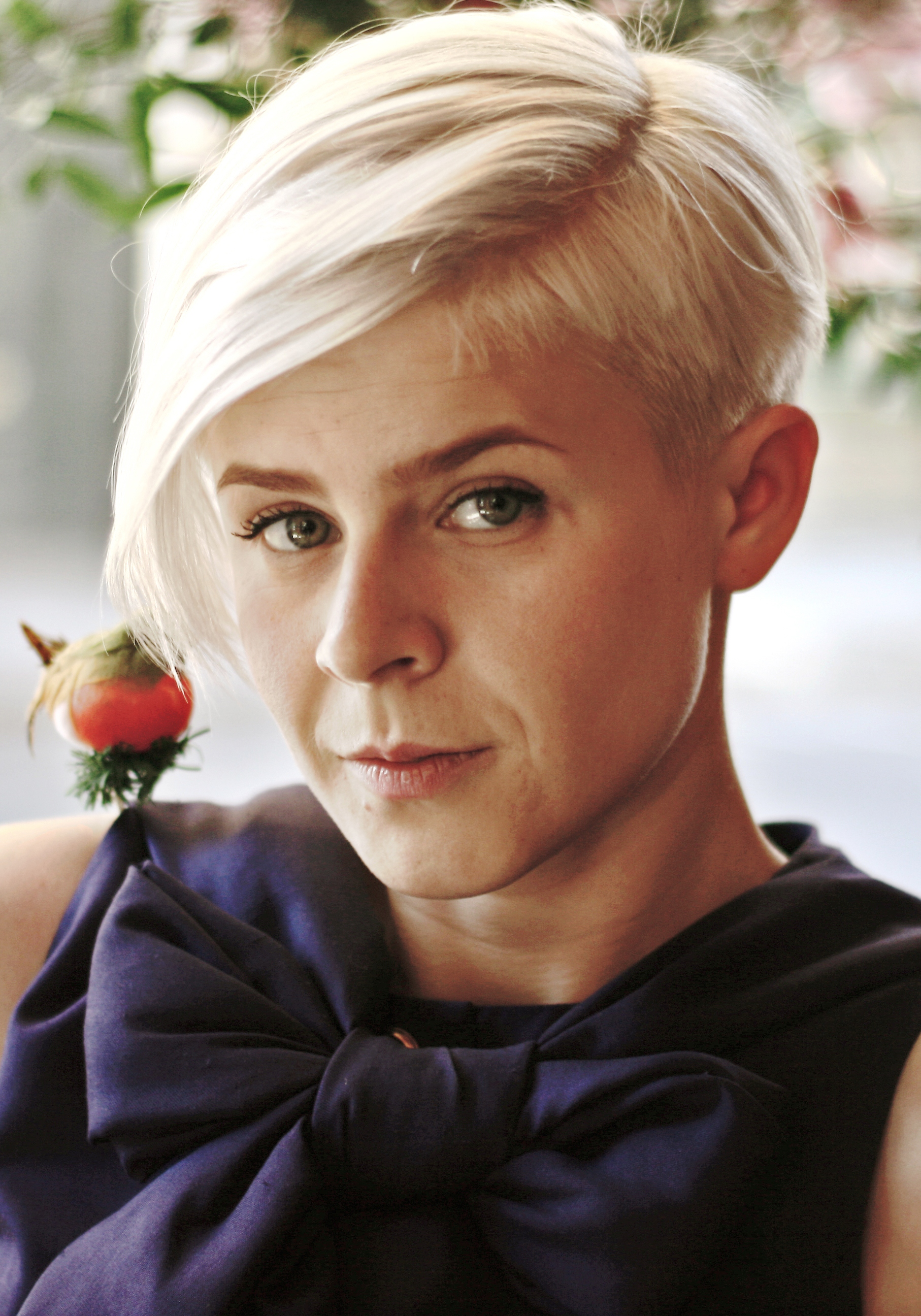
- Robyn in 2008
- Born: Robin Miriam Carlsson; 12 June 1979 (age 47); Stockholm, Sweden
- Occupations: Singer; songwriter; record producer; DJ
- Years active: 1989–present
- Known for: Discography
- Partner: Max Vitali (2013–2020)
- Children: 1
- Awards: Full list
- Musical career
- Genres: Pop; electropop; synth-pop; dance-pop; alt-pop; R&B (early)
- Instrument: Vocals
- Labels: Ricochet; Ariola; BMG; RCA; Jive; Konichiwa; Island; Cherrytree; Interscope; Young
- Website: www.robyn.com

Robin Miriam Carlsson (Swedish pronunciation: [ˈrɔ̌bːɪn ˈkɑ̌ːɭsɔn]; born 12 June 1979), known professionally as Robyn (pronounced [ˈrɔ̌bːʏn]), is a Swedish pop singer, songwriter and producer. Musically, she is noted for performing upbeat dance-oriented songs that often feature melancholic lyrics, and has been called the "stateswoman of alt-pop" by The Guardian.

Her 1995 debut album Robyn Is Here produced two Billboard Hot 100 top 10 singles: "Do You Know (What It Takes)" and "Show Me Love". Her second and third albums, My Truth (1999) and Don't Stop the Music (2002), were released in Sweden. After forming her own label, Konichiwa Records, and becoming an independent artist, Robyn returned to international success with her fourth album, Robyn (2005). The album brought a Grammy Award nomination and spawned the singles "Be Mine!" and "With Every Heartbeat" – the latter of which topped the charts in the United Kingdom.

Robyn released a trilogy of mini-albums in 2010, with all parts culminating in her seventh studio album, Body Talk (2010). They received unanimous critical acclaim and three Grammy Award nominations, and produced three top-10 singles: "Dancing on My Own", "Hang with Me" and "Indestructible". The sleeper hit “Dancing on My Own” is often credited as her signature song and helped rejuvenate her career. Robyn followed this with two collaborative EPs: Do It Again (2014) with Röyksopp, and Love Is Free (2015) with La Bagatelle Magique. She followed this with her eighth solo album, Honey (2018) to widespread acclaim. After an eight year hiatus, she released her ninth solo album, Sexistential (2026), which received critical acclaim and featured the top-ten single "Dopamine".

== Early life ==
Robin Miriam Carlsson was born on 12 June 1979 in Stockholm. Her parents led an independent theatre group called Scheherazade, and growing up in that environment influenced her sense of style: "I was around people who dressed up for work every day, and so the concept of how you can use clothes to change your personality or communicate who you are is very interesting to me." Robyn has two younger siblings.

== Career ==
=== 1989–1993: Early career ===
Robyn voiced the character of Miranda in the 1989 Swedish-Norwegian animated film The Journey to Melonia. Directed by Per Åhlin, the film is loosely based on William Shakespeare's The Tempest.

Robyn recorded "Du kan alltid bli nummer ett" ("You Can Always be Number One"), the theme song for the Swedish television show Lilla Sportspegeln, in 1991 at age 12. This was a version in Swedish of the theme song for Sport Goofy in Soccermania (1987). Robyn performed her first original song at that age on another television show, Söndagsöppet (Sundays). Robyn performed an opening act for Tina Turner in Sweden.

As a reaction to her parents' divorce, she wrote a song called "In My Heart". She was discovered by Swedish pop singer Meja in the early 1990s when Meja and her band, Legacy of Sound, visited Robyn's school as part of a musical workshop. Impressed by Robyn's performance of "In My Heart", Meja contacted her management and a meeting was arranged with Robyn and her parents. At age 14, after completing middle school education in 1993, Robyn signed with Ricochet Records Sweden (which was acquired by BMG in 1994). Robyn collaborated with producers Max Martin and Denniz Pop, who gave the singer a gritty (but popular) sound.

=== 1994–2004: Robyn Is Here, My Truth and Don't Stop the Music ===
She began her pop-music career at age 15, signing with RCA Records in 1994 and releasing her debut single ("You've Got That Somethin'") in Sweden. Later that year, Robyn's Swedish breakthrough came with the single "Do You Really Want Me (Show Respect)". The singles became part of the album Robyn Is Here, which was released in October 1995. Robyn also contributed vocals to Blacknuss' 1996 single, "Roll with Me." She entered Sweden's pre-selection for the Eurovision Song Contest 1997 as co-writer and producer of "Du gör mig hel igen" ("You Make Me Whole Again"), which was performed by Cajsalisa Ejemyr. In Melodifestivalen 1997, the song finished fourth. Economic geographer Johansson described Robyn as one of the earliest examples of the "Cheiron sound", which became prominent during the Y2K pop era, noting Max Martin's use of his trademark large synthesizer chords in his productions for her.

Robyn's US breakthrough came in late 1997, when the dance-pop/R&B singles "Show Me Love" and "Do You Know (What It Takes)" reached the top 10 of the Billboard Hot 100. She performed "Show Me Love" on the American children's show All That that year. She also made two appearances on Soul Train: on October 4, 1997, performing "Do You Know (What It Takes)" and "Just Another Girlfriend", and returned as the headlining act on April 25, 1998, performing "Do You Know (What It Takes)" again as well as the QDIII remix of "Do You Really Want Me (Show Respect)". The songs also performed well in the UK. Robyn re-released "Do You Really Want Me (Show Respect)" internationally, but it was less successful than the other releases. It was ineligible for the US charts because there was no retail single available, but it reached number 32 on the Hot 100 Airplay chart. "Show Me Love" was featured in the 1998 Lukas Moodysson film, Fucking Åmål, and the song's title was used as the title of the film in English-speaking countries. As Robyn's popularity grew internationally, she was diagnosed with exhaustion and returned to Sweden to recover.

Robyn's second album, My Truth, was released in Sweden in May 1999 and subsequently in Europe. The single, "Electric", was a commercial success and propelled My Truth to the number-two position in Sweden. The autobiographical album included the tracks "Universal Woman" and "Giving You Back". Despite her US success with Robyn Is Here, My Truth was not released in that country, partly because it included two songs which referenced an abortion she had in her teens. Robyn contributed to Christian Falk's 1999 debut solo album, Quel Bordel (What a Mess), appearing on "Remember" and "Celebration". The following year, she appeared on "Intro/Fristil" on Petter's self-titled album. In 2001, Robyn performed "Say You'll Walk the Distance" for the soundtrack of On the Line.

She signed a worldwide deal with Jive Records in July 2001, moving from BMG after the singer was "disillusioned with the lack of artistic control [she] had there"; a year later, Jive was acquired by BMG when it bought Zomba Records. Robyn later said, "I was back where I started!" In October 2002, she released the album Don't Stop the Music in Sweden. The album's singles, "Keep This Fire Burning" and "Don't Stop the Music", received airplay in Scandinavia and elsewhere in Europe. The promotional single "O Baby" became the fifth-most-played song on Swedish radio in 2003. The title track was later covered by the Swedish girl group Play, and the lead single ("Keep This Fire Burning") was covered by the British soul singer Beverley Knight. In May 2004, Robyn's Best was released in the US. It was a condensed version of her debut album, with no material from her later releases. In 2006, after her departure from BMG, Det Bästa Med Robyn (The Best of Robyn) was released in Sweden with material from her first three albums; notable omissions, however, were the singles "Don't Stop the Music" and "Keep This Fire Burning".

=== 2004–2009: Konichiwa Records and Robyn ===
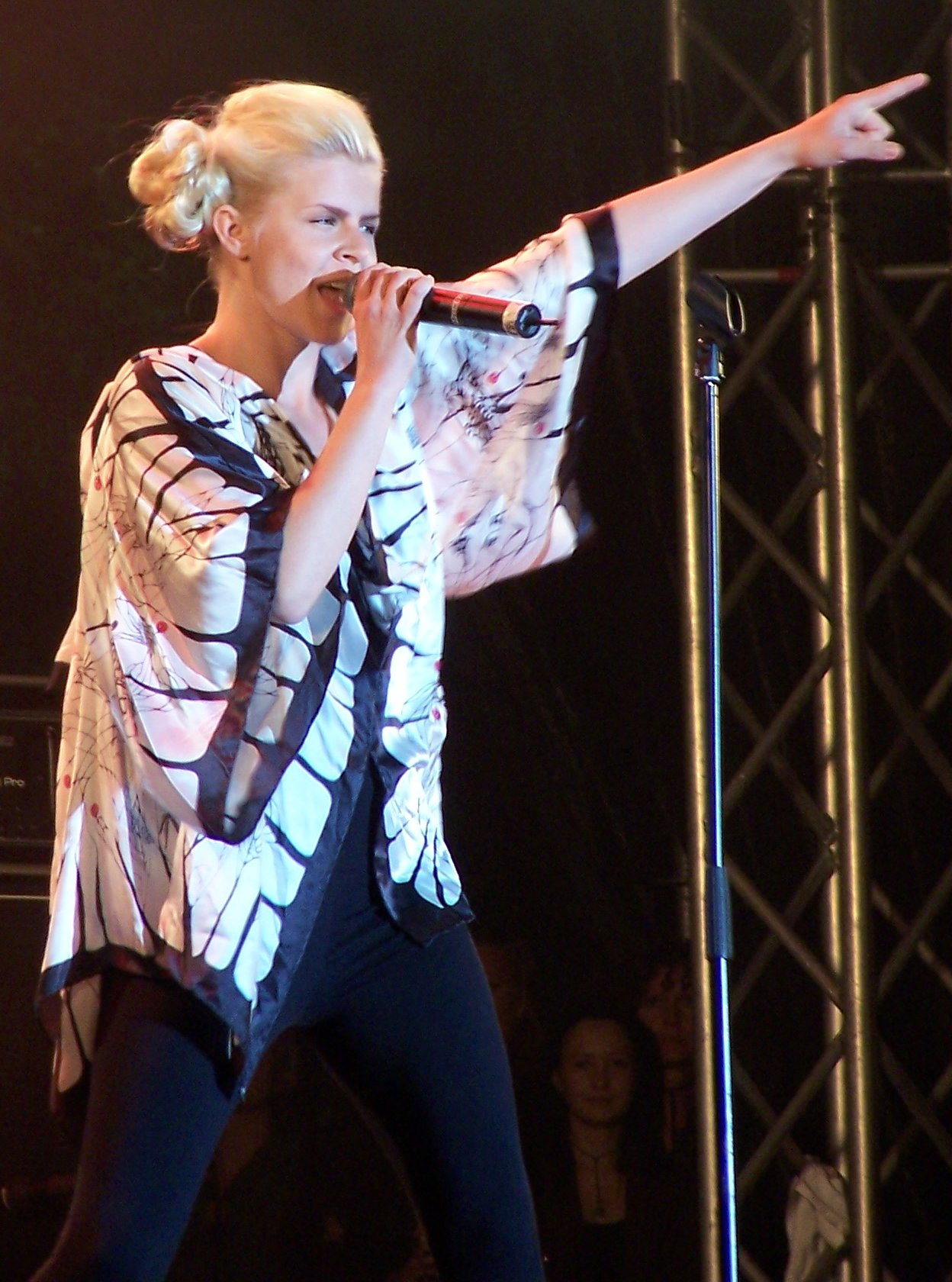
On tour in 2005

The decade-long relationship between Robyn and her label ended in 2004. When Jive Records reacted negatively to "Who's That Girl?"'s new electropop sound, the singer decided to release music on her own. In early 2005, she announced that she was leaving Jive to start her own label. Konichiwa Records was created to liberate Robyn artistically. She said on her website that her new album would be released earlier than anticipated, with notable collaborators including Klas Åhlund from Teddybears STHLM, Swedish duo The Knife and former Cheiron Studios producer Alexander Kronlund.

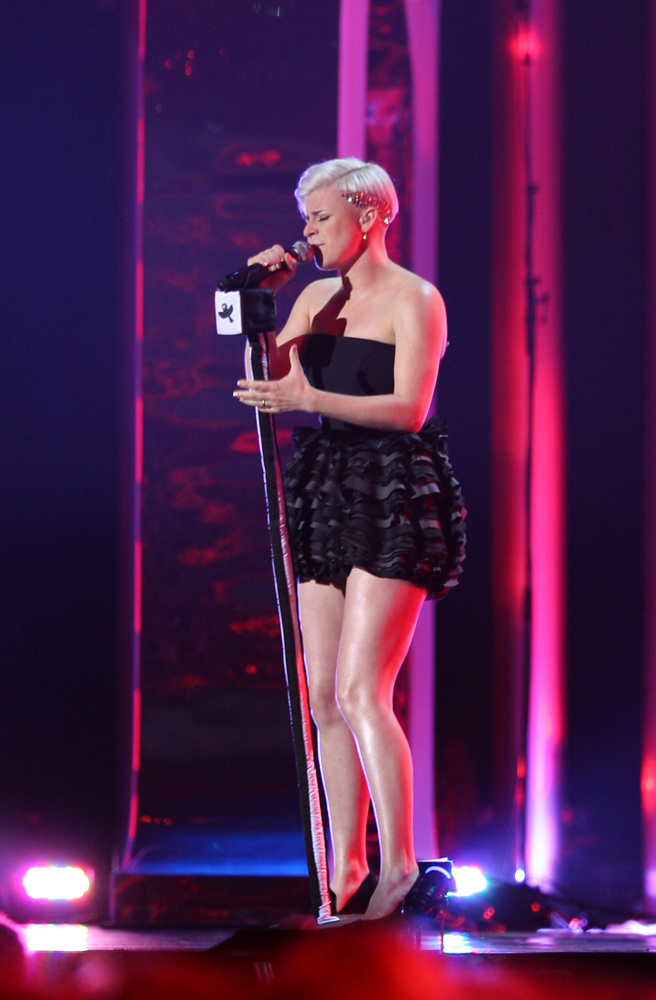
Performing at the 2008 Nobel Peace Prize concert

Robyn released the single "Be Mine!" in March 2005. Her fourth album, Robyn, was her first number-one album in Sweden when it was released a month later. Influenced by electronica, rap, R&B and new-age music, Robyn was critically praised and earned the singer three 2006 Swedish Grammy Awards: "Årets Album" (Best Album), "Årets Kompositör" (Best Writer, with Klas Åhlund) and "Årets Pop Kvinnlig" (Best Pop Female). The album evoked global interest in Robyn, who was recognised for co-writing the song "Money for Nothing" for Darin Zanyar (his debut single). She released three more singles—"Who's That Girl?", "Handle Me" and "Crash and Burn Girl"—from the eponymous LP, which was popular in Sweden. Robyn appeared on the Basement Jaxx track "Hey U" from their 2006 album, Crazy Itch Radio, and contributed "Dream On" and "C.C.C" to Christian Falk's People Say (his second album) that year. In December 2006, Robyn released The Rakamonie EP in the UK as a preview of her more-recent material; this was followed by the March 2007 release of "Konichiwa Bitches". A revised edition of Robyn was released in the UK the following month, with two new tracks—"With Every Heartbeat" (a collaboration with Kleerup) and "Cobrastyle" (a cover of a 2006 single by Swedish rockers Teddybears)—with slightly altered versions of the original music.

The second single from the release in the United Kingdom was "With Every Heartbeat" with Kleerup, which was released in late July 2007 and topped the UK Singles Chart, becoming the second single by Swedish artists to top the charts in Britain during the 2000s decade after Eric Prydz's "Call on Me" in September and October 2004. Robyn appeared on Jo Whiley's BBC Radio 1 showcase show, Live Lounge. In Australia, where Robyn reached the top ten of the iTunes Store's album chart, "With Every Heartbeat" received attention on radio and video networks. Robyn contributed vocals to Fleshquartet's single, "This One's for You", from their Voices of Eden album that year. Konichiwa Records signed an international licensing deal with Universal Music Group to distribute Robyn's music globally, and her UK recordings are released by Island Records. The Rakamonie EP was released in January 2008 by Cherrytree Records (a subsidiary of Interscope Records), and the US version of Robyn was released in April of that year. "With Every Heartbeat", "Handle Me" and "Cobrastyle" were top-10 club singles, and "With Every Heartbeat" received airplay on US pop and dance radio stations. Robyn provided backing vocals on Britney Spears' 2007 single, "Piece of Me", and appeared on the Fyre Department remix of "Sexual Eruption" by rapper Snoop Dogg. She made a brief US tour to promote Robyn, and was the supporting act for Madonna's Sticky & Sweet Tour on European dates in 2008. In January 2009, Robyn received a 2008 Swedish Grammis Award for Best Live Act.

=== 2010–2016: Body Talk, Do It Again and EPs ===
She released the first album of the Body Talk trilogy, Body Talk Pt. 1, on 14 June 2010 in the Nordic countries on EMI and on 15 June in the US on Interscope Records. It was preceded by the single "Dancing on My Own" on 1 June 2010. The song was Robyn's first number-one single in Sweden and her fourth top-10 single in the UK and the US, peaking at number eight on the UK Singles Chart and number three on Billboard's Hot Dance Club Songs chart. In July 2010, she sang a minimalist, electro cover version of Alicia Keys' "Try Sleeping with a Broken Heart" live on IHeartRadio. Robyn made the All Hearts Tour in July and August 2010 with American singer Kelis to promote the Body Talk albums, and a four-date UK tour at the end of October.

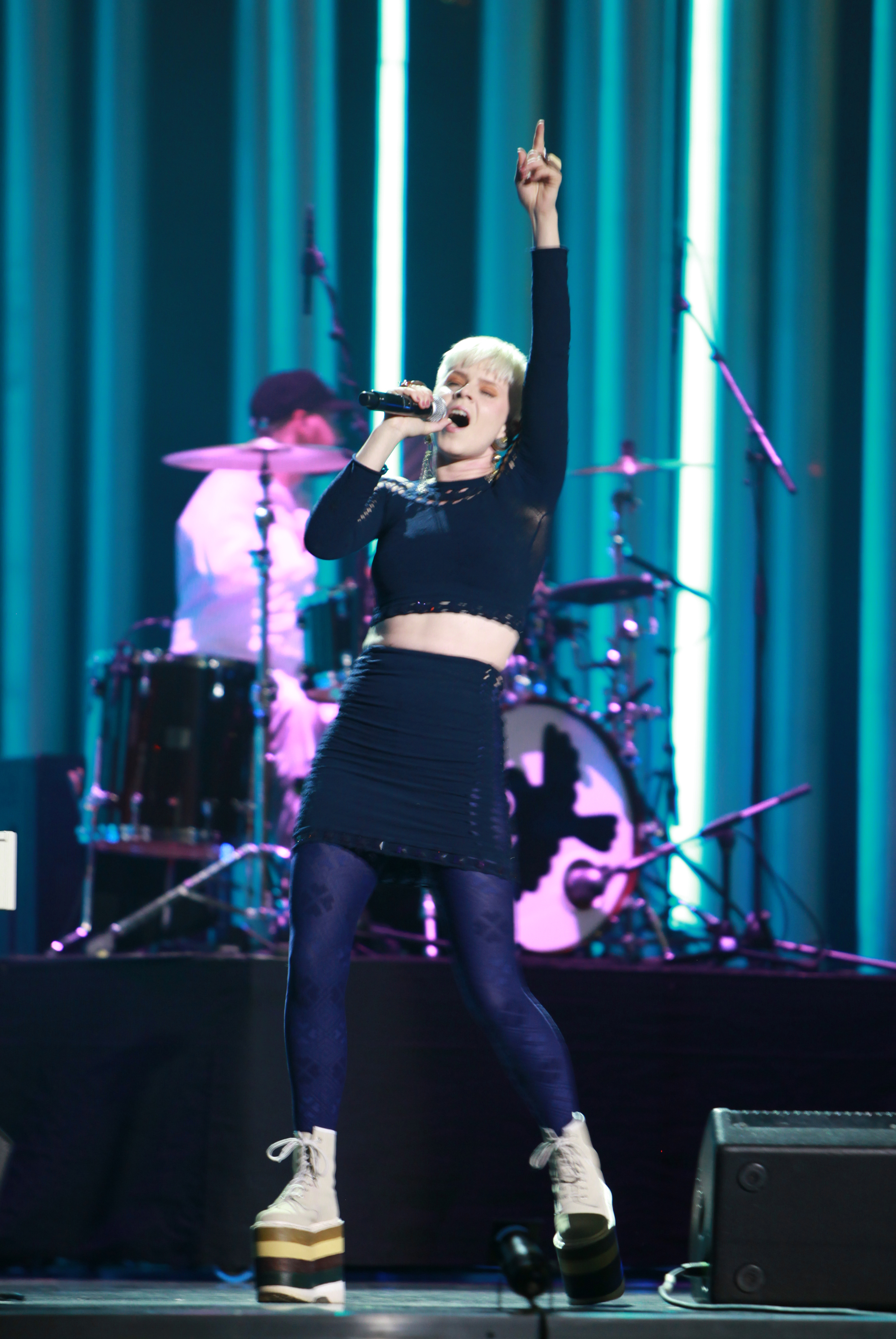
At the 2010 Nobel Peace Prize concert

On 6 September 2010, Body Talk Pt. 2 was released in the UK. It was preceded by the lead single, a dance version of "Hang with Me" from Body Talk Pt. 1, the day before. The album includes a duet with American rapper Snoop Dogg, "U Should Know Better". Robyn performed "Dancing on My Own" with Deadmau5 at the 2010 MTV Video Music Awards on 12 September. In a BBC Newsbeat interview, she explained her decision to release three albums in one year: "It was just something I felt like I needed to do. I just never thought about selling records or not, making this decision. I just did it for myself. It's a way of, for me, to stay inspired and to be able to do the things I like to do". However, Robyn said that she would not do it again: "When you do 16 or 13 songs in one go, you kind of empty yourself, and it takes a while to fill back up and have new things to talk about, so I think it's good for everyone". Robyn announced the release of the single, "Indestructible", on 13 October 2010; an acoustic version appeared on Body Talk Pt. 2. The song was released on 17 November in Scandinavia and 22 November in the UK. Co-written by Klas Åhlund, it was described as a "pulsating full power version [that] takes every ounce of that emotion and wraps it up in another exceptional disco-pop record worthy of any dance-floor or passion-laden sing-a-long." Robyn planned to collaborate with Swedish producer Max Martin on the song "Time Machine"; Martin produced Robyn's US singles, "Do You Know (What It Takes)" and "Show Me Love", both of which peaked in the top 10 on the Billboard 100 in 1997. The Body Talk albums have sold 91,000 copies in the US.

Robyn guest-starred on "War at the Roses", a 2010 episode of Gossip Girl, where she performed an acoustic version of "Hang with Me"; "Dancing on My Own" was featured at the end of the episode. In November, she said she would return to the studio in January 2011 with enough material to release a new album later that year. Robyn opened for Coldplay on their 2012 tour in Dallas, Houston, Tampa, Miami, Atlanta, Charlotte, Philadelphia and Washington, D.C. In mid-2013, she appeared with Paul Rudd and Sean Combs on "Go Kindergarten" from the Lonely Island's The Wack Album. Robyn posted two videos of the Snoop Dogg collaboration ("U Should Know Better" and "Behind the Scenes") and a game, Mixory, on 21 and 22 June 2013. That year she received the Stockholm KTH Royal Institute of Technology Great Prize for "artistic contributions and embrace of technology", worth 1.2 million Swedish kronor (around £117,000 at the time), which she planned to donate to a cause of her choice. However, she used the money to fund the annual technology Teklafestival for girls age 11 to 18 around the world.

Robyn sang on Neneh Cherry's "Out of the Black", from Cherry's album Blank Project, in 2014. She also announced the Do It Again Tour with Röyksopp and a collaborative mini-album, Do It Again, that year. The tour ended prematurely after the death of Robyn's longtime friend and collaborator, Christian Falk. An EP of their final collaboration, Love Is Free, was released soon afterwards. Robyn appeared at the Popaganda Festival in Sweden the following year and performed songs written with Falk before she postponed subsequent performances because she was still grieving.

She premiered a dance set of remixed versions of her songs at the May 2016 Boston Calling Music Festival, with plans for more dates during the year. Robyn released Trust Me, a collaboration EP with Mr. Tophat, in November 2016. She appeared on "That Could Have Been Me", a track from Todd Rundgren's album White Knight, the following year.

=== 2017–2019: Honey ===
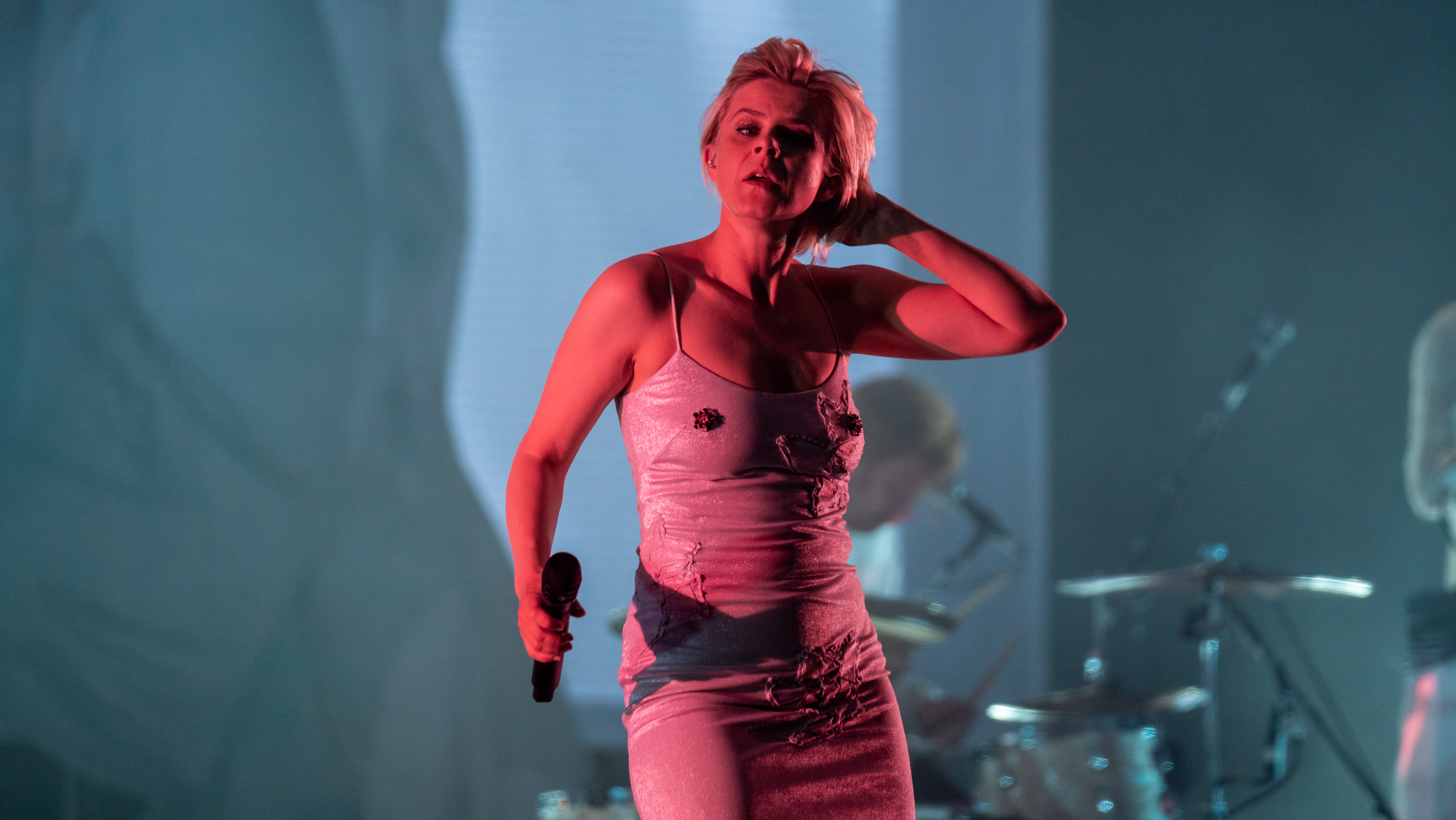
Robyn performing at the Primavera Sound Festival in June 2019

Robyn describes her years from 2010 to 2017 as "rebooting". In March 2017, a new Robyn song called "Honey" was used in the soundtrack of the final season of HBO TV series, Girls. The creator of the show, Lena Dunham selected it from a collection of her in-progress tracks. Robyn finalised it specially for the series.

In February 2018, Robyn answered a fan on Twitter, that she will release her new album "some time this year". During an interview with Kindness, she revealed she was almost done with her new album. Afterwards, at a party, she debuted the full version of her new song "Honey". On 23 July, a new song entitled "Missing U" was enlisted as a single, and later taken down. Fans quickly began noticing the hints she was dropping, including a post on Twitter with the hashtag #MissingU. It was released on 1 August 2018.

On 1 August 2018, Robyn presented "Missing U" on Annie Mac's BBC Radio 1 show. There she talked about the long silence and the process of making the upcoming album to be released before 2018's end. Robyn also released a mini-documentary featuring the song and a tribute to her fans who were missing her and her new music for years. On 19 September 2018, Robyn announced her upcoming album is titled Honey to be released on 26 October 2018. In November 2018, Robyn announced she would be touring across North America and Europe come 2019. The trek kicked off on 5 February 2019 and ended that April. On 27 September 2019, she performed in Kungsträdgården in Stockholm during the international climate strikes. Before singing Ever Again, she also told the audience she had met climate researcher Johan Rockström.

=== 2020–2024: DJ sets, signing to Young Artists and further musical projects ===
In February 2020, Robyn accepted the award for Songwriter of the Decade at the 2020 NME Awards. After cancelled promotion, gigs, and festivals starting that year amid the COVID-19 pandemic, Robyn launched a series of live-stream DJ sets from Stockholm, Robyn Presents Club DOMO, and also participated in Record Store Day with a series of previously unreleased remixes of tracks from her record Honey for limited-release vinyl then streaming by her favorite DJs, artists and collaborators, including Joe Goddard, Avalon Emerson, Robert Hood, Louie Vega, Soulwax, Kim Ann Foxman, Young Marco, The Blessed Madonna, Patrick Topping and Planningtorock. The next two years Robyn collaborated on SG Lewis and TEED's electropop track "Impact" with Channel Tres for the former's album Times, Jónsi's avant-pop track "Salt Licorice" produced by A.G. Cook for the former's album Shiver, and Joakim Åhlund and Björn Yttling's revived side project Smile's psychedelic pop track "Call My Name" for their album Phantom Island.

In September 2021, Rolling Stone, from a poll of more than 250 artists, musicians, producers, critics, journalists and industry figures, ranked "Dancing on My Own" at number 20, between Billie Holiday's "Strange Fruit" and John Lennon's "Imagine", on their reissued list of "The 500 Greatest Songs of All Time", the decade's highest entry on their list. Also that month Robyn signed a management contract with Young Artists, the global division of Young (a music and arts organisation founded in London) that still maintained her record label and distribution agreements apart from their own. In November 2021, Robyn received an Honorary Award for her "significant contributions" to the music industry from the Swedish Music Publishers Board who went on to say that she had "forever written herself into music history".

=== 2025–present: Sexistential ===
In 2025, Robyn was part of the 50th anniversary celebrations of Saturday Night Live. On 14 February 2025 she performed "Dancing on My Own" and Talking Heads' "This Must Be the Place (Naive Melody)" with David Byrne on SNL50: The Homecoming Concert, while also attending the show's 50th Anniversary Special. She had performed as a musical guest on Saturday Night Live on December 10, 2011.

In September 2025, Åhlund revealed he and Robyn had completed a new album. Two months later, "Dopamine" was released, charting in the top ten on the Sverigetopplistan, Sweden's national weekly music chart. Her ninth studio album, Sexistential, was released on 27 March 2026. Preceding the album's release, "Sexistential" and "Talk to Me" were released on 7 January 2026.

She starred in the 2026 video game Grand Theft Auto VI as the radio host of Flash FM.

== Artistry ==
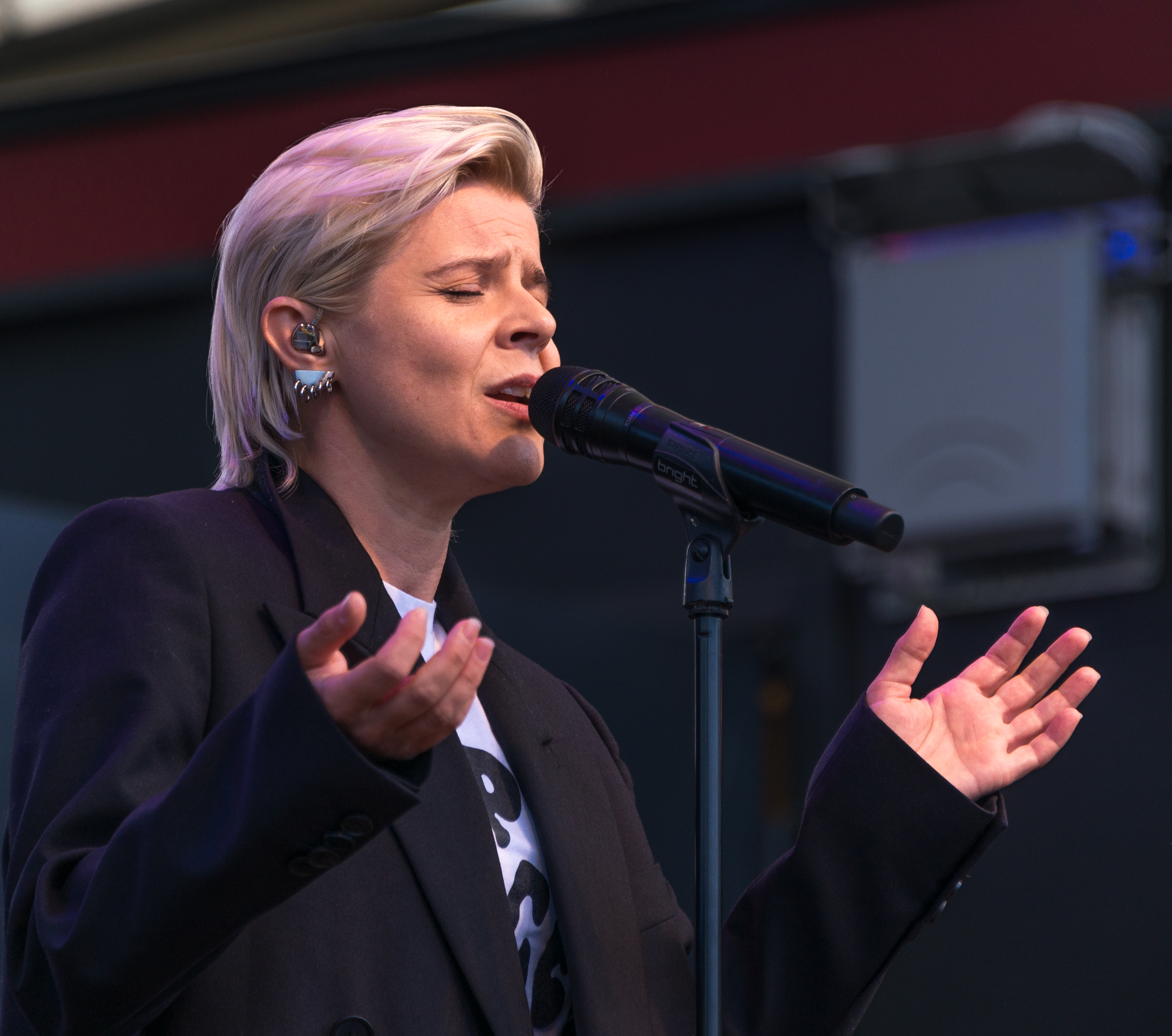
Robyn in September 2019

Robyn has a soprano vocal range. She described herself as a pop music artist, but admits that dance music is her "biggest reference". The Dallas Observer's Preston Jones described her music as "electro-pop confections, with their gleaming, sexy, sophisticated surfaces, each laced with sharply observed lyrics capable of leaving a bruise or breaking your heart", and characterised by "lovelorn lyrics or her synth-sweetened hooks". Alex Morris of Rolling Stone described "the euphoria of heartbreak" as a unifying theme underlying most of her albums, while The Daily Telegraph's Alice Vincent said "Her ability to translate the searing, antisocial brutality of heartbreak became a balm for millions". Robyn debuted as a mainstream pop-R&B singer during the 1990s, but felt limited by the artistic constraints of working for a major record label. Andrew R. Cho of NBCNews.com described her earlier work as "cookie cutter 1990s R&B out of the TLC playbook". By the time she reinvented herself as an independent artist in 2005, she had pivoted away from R&B and adopted an experimental electronic and synth-pop sound. Her fourth album, Robyn, retained some influences of American R&B and hip hop, but "largely stuck to the sound and feel of electronic gadgets, manipulating them to sound like other genres".

Writer and musician Sasha Frere-Jones called Robyn "remarkably adept at producing pleasurable, accessible pop that, like some kind of graphite alloy, is light but strong, able to carry humor and emotional weight". Her lyrics sometimes reference female empowerment and independence; Frere-Jones said her "wheelhouse is a classic subset of the dance song: a number that moves ahead quickly, with juicy chord changes, while the lyrics crack open with pain". According to Jake Hall of i-D, the term "sad banger" has become virtually synonymous with Robyn since she released "Dancing on My Own".

While writing her eighth studio album, Honey, Robyn found that she was no longer interested in creating "tidy pop songs", exploring music she described as hypnotic "that didn't have a beginning and an end" unlike her previous work. She attributed this shift in approach to lacking the "killer instinct" to attempt to replicate her hits. Laura Snapes of The Guardian described the album as "exploratory dance music that reflects the hopelessness and ecstasy that informed her time away from the spotlight". Robyn has said that she prefers writing with other artists instead of independently, but finds it frustrating that people expect her as a woman "to have written the lyrics and the guys to have made the music". Her collaborators have said that she "was as involved in the technical work as they were". Caryn Ganz of The New York Times called her writing process "designed to wring out truths", while songwriter and producer Klas Åhlund called it a series of "intimate, open and sort of confessional conversations", in which they would share details they wouldn't with others.

== Legacy ==
Various publications have nicknamed Robyn the "Queen of Sad Bangers", as well as the "Queen of Heartbreak". BBC News Online's Mark Savage said "No self-respecting pop album is now complete without a 'sadbanger'", citing Robyn's influence on the music of Dua Lipa, Troye Sivan and Carly Rae Jepsen. Robyn's debut, Robyn Is Here, was instrumental in helping launch Max Martin's career in pop music, and creating demand for "white girl R&B singers, from Mandy Moore to Billie Piper." When Robyn turned down Jive Records' attempt to sign her in the United States, the label shifted their focus to a young artist named Britney Spears, with the head of Jive calling Spears "an American Robyn – a Europop teen queen, with an added dash of 'girl next door.'" Martin ended up producing much of Spears's debut album ...Baby One More Time, and she was seen as "easier to control than the 'forceful' Swedish teenager."

Robyn (2005) has been cited as a foundational pop album of the 2000s, cementing the validity of "poptimism" in music critics circles that "[made] indie nerds lighten up." It gained significant acclaim from indie magazine Pitchfork, which had only covered a few pop albums prior. Their acclaim "placed synthpop on the same level as earnest, artsy acts such as Arcade Fire and Sufjan Stevens." She was seen as "a bellwether for rock getting less rigid in introducing non-guitar sounds and for pop music becoming more dance-driven and experimental."

Robyn helped shape contemporary pop music by taking creative control, introducing indie elements to mainstream pop, and including feminist and other political themes in her music. Variety attributed her work as a "savant" and "pioneer" upon going independent to the accelerated prominence of the alternative pop genre starting in the late 2000s. According to El Hunt of NME, the Body Talk project "paved the way for more experimental, alternatively-minded pop stars to find a place in the landscape in years to come" and pioneered "a different kind of pop". Nina Derwin of Parade said the same album "Robyn, Body Talk and Honey cemented her reputation for combining emotional vulnerability with clever, innovative, and empowering dance music, influencing an entire generation of pop and electronic artists along the way".

According to friend and collaborator Joseph Mount, after the singer's come back in the mid-2000s, there was "more than one Robyn-style track on every pop person's record". According to Alexandra Pollard of The Independent, "Ask any young pop singer today who their biggest influence is and chances are they'll have mentioned Robyn". She has been recognised as an influence on acts like Carly Rae Jepsen, Lorde, Charli XCX, Zara Larsson, Taylor Swift, Christine and the Queens, Tove Lo, Harry Styles, OMD's Andy McCluskey, Ariel Rechtshaid and Perfume Genius. While accepting her British Dance Act award at the Brit Awards 2025, Charli XCX shouted Robyn out in her speech, among other dance acts she had been influenced by. Robyn's "triumph in rejection" has led to her status as an LGBTQ icon.

Publications such as The Guardian and Rolling Stone have called Robyn one of the most influential pop artists of her generation, whereas Billboard declared her "one of the most critically lauded pop artists of the century". NPR's Jessica Hopper deemed Robyn "The 21st Century's Pop Oracle", while The New York Times' Caryn Ganz called her "Pop's Glittery Rebel".

== Personal life ==
Robyn began dating Olof Inger in 2002, and they remained engaged until 2011. She later became engaged to videographer Max Vitali, whom she met while making the music video for "Be Mine!" The couple separated for two years in the mid-2010s, reconciled by 2018, and later ended their relationship. In July 2023, Robyn revealed that she had a son conceived through IVF treatment using an anonymous donor.

== Discography ==
- Robyn Is Here (1995)
- My Truth (1999)
- Don't Stop the Music (2002)
- Robyn (2005)
- Body Talk Pt. 1 (2010)
- Body Talk Pt. 2 (2010)
- Body Talk (2010)
- Honey (2018)
- Sexistential (2026)

== Tours ==
=== Headlining ===
- All Hearts Tour (2010)
- Body Talk Tour (2010-2011)
- Honey Tour (2019)
- The Sexistential Tour (2026)

=== Opening act ===
- Madonna – Sticky & Sweet Tour (2008)
- Katy Perry – California Dreams Tour (2011)
- Coldplay – Mylo Xyloto Tour (2012)
- Harry Styles – Together, Together (2026)

== See also ==
- Popular music in Sweden
