= Kleerup =

Swedish electropop musician (born 1979)

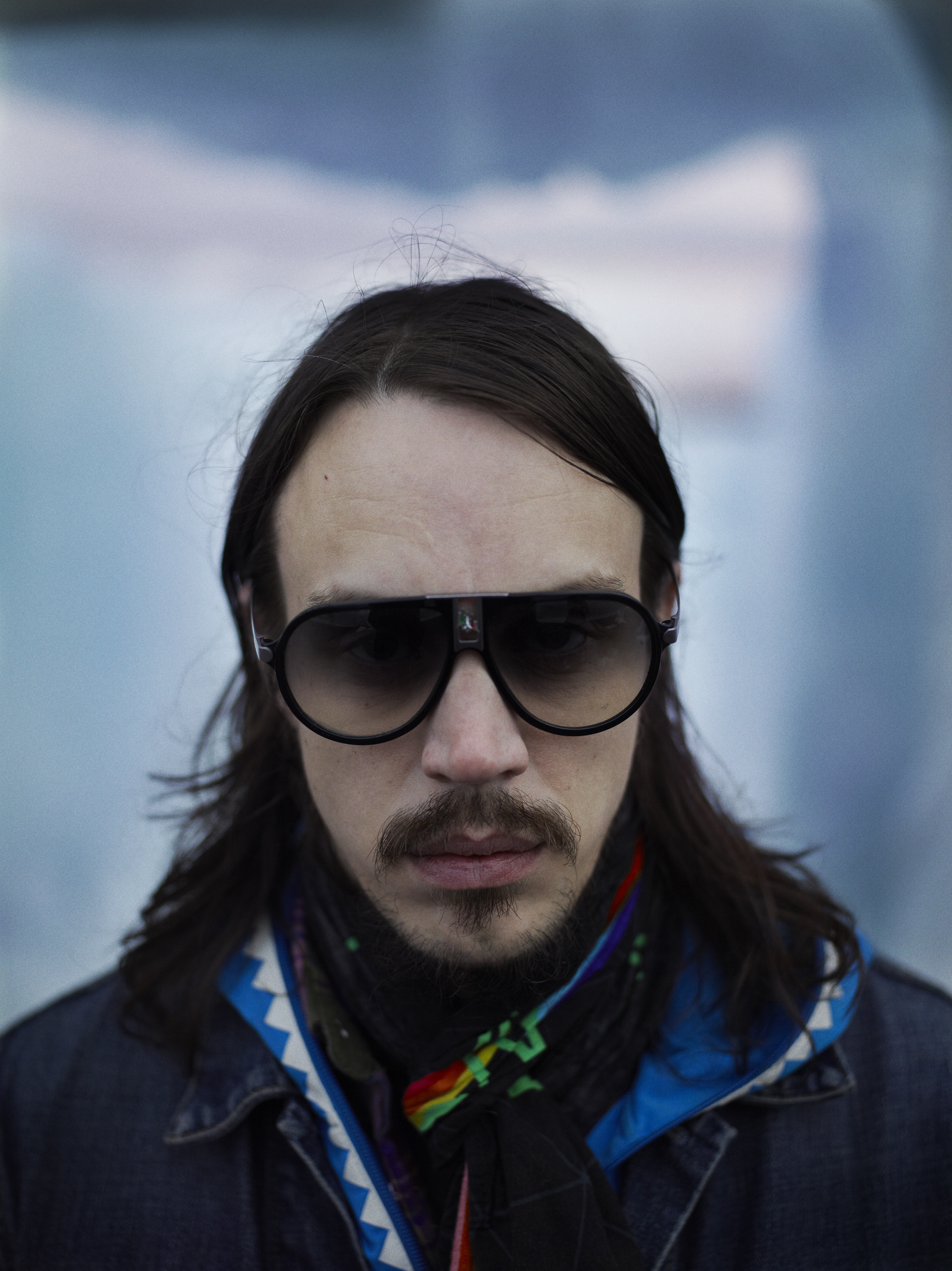
- Kleerup in 2013

Background information
- Origin: Stockholm, Sweden
- Genres: Electropop; synth-pop; pop rock
- Occupations: Record producer; songwriter; multi-instrumentalist; drummer
- Instruments: Vocals; percussion; piano; guitar; synthesizer; keyboard
- Years active: 2004–present
- Labels: EMI; Warner
- Website: kleerup.net (archived at Wayback Machine)

Andreas Kleerup (born 1979), professionally known as Kleerup, is a Swedish electropop musician.

== Career ==
Kleerup was initially influenced by rock performers including Frank Zappa, Mötley Crüe and Kiss, and later gravitated towards electronic acts such as Air and OMD. He began his music career as a songwriter, going on to tour with Teddybears and Robyn. In 2007, Kleerup released his debut single "With Every Heartbeat" featuring Robyn, which peaked at number 23 on the Swedish Singles Chart. The single achieved greater success outside Sweden, most notably in the United Kingdom, where it topped the UK Singles Chart in August 2007 and became the second single by Swedish artists to do so in the 2000s after "Call on Me" by Eric Prydz in September and October 2004. The single also peaked within the top 40 on the charts in several other European countries.

Kleerup's self-titled debut album, released in 2008, featured collaborators such as Lykke Li, Robyn, and Neneh Cherry. He received six Grammis nominations for the album, winning in the "Best Newcomer", "Best Producer", and "Best Composer" categories.

The 2010s also saw Kleerup expand his career as a composer. In 2010, he and Carl Bagge composed the music for Stockholm City Theatre's 50th-anniversary performance, a musical adaptation of Nobel Prize laureate Harry Martinson's Aniara, performed by a double string quartet.

In 2010, NME named Kleerup one of the 20 hottest producers in music.

In September 2014, Kleerup announced the first of two mini-LPs, As If We Never Won, and shared credit of the song "Let Me In" with Susanne Sundfør. H&M used the track for their Fall Fashion 2014 advertising campaign in cinema, TV, and Online.

In addition to his work as a composer and songwriter, Kleerup has worked with and remixed such iconic artists as Lady Gaga, Moby, The Cardigans, and Nonono.

In March 2020, Kleerup released his latest album, 2.

== Personal life ==
He has one child.

Kleerup was diagnosed with attention deficit hyperactivity disorder (ADHD) and Tourette syndrome in 2007. He has also struggled with depression for long periods of his life and made a suicide attempt in 2009.

== Discography ==
=== Albums ===
Year	Title	Peak chart positions
Year	Title	SWE
2008	Kleerup	7
2012	Aniara	47
2020	2	—

=== EPs ===
Year	Title	Peak chart positions
Year	Title	SWE
2009	Hello Holla	—
2009	Lead Singer Syndrome (with Markus Krunegård)	—
2014	As If We Never Won	52
2016	Det var den sommaren	—

=== Singles ===
Year	Title	Peak chart positions		
Year	Title	SWE	DEN	UK
2005	"Medication"	—	—	—
2007	"With Every Heartbeat" (with Robyn)	18	7	1
2008	"Longing for Lullabies" (with Titiyo)	7	10	—
2008	"3AM" (with Marit Bergman)	35	—	—
2008	"Forever" (with Neneh Cherry)	56 ^{1}	—	—
2013	"Requiem Solution" (with Loreen)	—	—	—
2014	"I Got You" (with Ola Salo)	—	—	—
2014	"Let Me In" (with Susanne Sundfør)	—	—	—
2015	"Imorgon är en annan dag"	43	—	—
2015	"Så länge skutan kan gå"	54	—	—
2015	"Beautiful Life"	60	—	—
2020	"I Need Love" (with Rebecca & Fiona)	—	—	—
"—" denotes a recording that did not chart or was not released.

^{1}Not officially released as a single, but charted due to extensive downloading.
