= Konichiwa Records =

Swedish record label

- Parent company: Universal Music Group
- Founded: 2005
- Founder: Robyn
- Distributors: Interscope Records (North America); Island Records (Europe); Universal Music Group (rest of the world)
- Genre: Pop, dance, synthpop, dance-pop
- Country of origin: Sweden
- Location: Stockholm
- Official website: konichiwa.se

Konichiwa Records is a record label founded by Swedish pop singer Robyn. The label has only one other artist signed, Zhala. The name "Konichiwa" is derived from the Japanese greeting こんにちは (Konnichi wa (with 2 n's)), meaning "hello" or "good day" (literally "this day is").

== Background ==
Amid the mid 1990s teen-marketed dance-pop renaissance that emerged from the cultural backlash and commercial slowdown in both North America and Europe to the grunge and Britpop waves, respectively, building tension regarding numerous creative differences between Robyn and RCA to capitalize on her rising star-power in the late 1990s, then between her and new label Jive (later bought by the former) in the early 2000s on her sonic, songwriting and aesthetic direction lead to Robyn striking out on her own, buying out of the latter contract and starting her own label entirely. Distribution deals with other major labels were later set up that wouldn't impact many of the creative decisions she wished to make for her records.

Following the release of the U.S. version of her 1995 debut Robyn is Here in early 1997, which charted on the Billboard Top 100, and its hit singles, "Do You Know (What It Takes)" and "Show Me Love" that were created with Swedish producer Max Martin and both charted in the top ten of its Hot 100 chart, she declined a label request to capitalize on it by touring with the Backstreet Boys. As many other labels at the time only saw those boy bands or girl groups such as the Spice Girls working commercially, her A&R aesthetically then wanted to craft her in a new image and corresponding sound translated to the late 90s, warping, repackaging then commodifying Madonna's initial message of sexual freedom and expression for markets coming-of-age but that could also appeal to older demographics, a cultural mold seen initially more charitably by some outlets as the "girl next door" but heavily criticized decades later and described more derisively by others as the "jailbait dynamo". Rejecting this aesthetic and Cheiron Studios' like-minded demos, Robyn's working relationship was Max and Denniz Pop was strained, and Max and the label molded their vision for this new lane of teen pop to Britney Spears, with the latter's input. Denniz would pass away from stomach cancer in 1998 prior to Britney's massive debut that became the blueprint for subsequent debuts from Christina Aguilera, Jessica Simpson, and Mandy Moore, with Cheiron being dubbed at the close of the teen pop era in 2003 by Rolling Stone as "Sweden's Lolita-pop dollhouse".

Her label Jive then raised concerns in early 1999 about the lyrics regarding her abortion in October 1998 at the age of 19 that was addressed in her songs "Giving You Back" and "88 Days" for her album to be released later that year, "My Truth", and the sound of several other tracks, wanting to re-record half the record entirely. Robyn refused, and as a result of the stalemate the album was only released by BMG in Sweden and limited territories. Finally, in mid-2003, after her album cycle for Don't Stop the Music, the label rejected the harder synthpop direction of her new demos influenced by Swedish band The Knife, especially "Who's That Girl", which was later released and charted at #26 in the UK and #37 in Sweden. Robyn decided in early 2005 to leave Jive and start her own record label Konichiwa Records. Robyn’s first album under the new label was called Robyn, and included collaborators Klas Åhlund from Teddybears STHLM, Swedish duo The Knife, and former Cheiron producer Alexander Kronlund. Robyn and Max Martin would later reunite on 2010s "Time Machine".
