= O Baby (Robyn song) =

Promotional single by Robyn

from the album Don't Stop the Music
- Released: 2003
- Studio: Lifeline Studios (Stockholm); Polar Studios (Stockholm)
- Genre: Pop
- Length: 4:06
- Label: BMG Sweden
- Songwriters: Alexander Kronlund; Robyn
- Producers: Ghost; Max Martin (add.); Alexander Kronlund (add.)

"O Baby" is a song by Swedish singer Robyn from her third studio album Don't Stop the Music (2002). Written by Alexander Kronlund and Robyn, it was produced by Johan Ekhé and Ulf Lindström of production duo Ghost, with additional production from Kronlund and Max Martin. The song marked Robyn's first collaboration with Martin since 1997's "Show Me Love". A pop ballad backed by organ, piano, and string arrangements, "O Baby" was issued as a promotional CD single by BMG Sweden and distributed to Swedish radio stations in 2003.

Music critics were ambivalent toward "O Baby", with some feeling it was aimed at commercial appeal and lacked substance. Following its promotional release, the song garnered significant airplay and attained top-ten positions on both the Svensktoppen and Trackslistan radio charts. It ultimately ranked as the fifth-most-played song on Swedish radio in 2003. Robyn has performed "O Baby" live on numerous occasions, including Allsång på Skansen and the 2003 birthday celebration of Victoria, Crown Princess of Sweden.

== Background and release ==
When the plans to release her second studio album My Truth (1999) outside of Sweden were shelved, Robyn sought out to leave her international record deal with RCA and BMG. After nearly two years of being unable to work, she bought herself out of the contract and entered a new international deal with Jive in 2001, while remaining with BMG in Sweden. She then began writing for her third studio album Don't Stop the Music (2002). After experiencing performance anxiety at the start of the writing process, she felt relaxed once she worked in the studio. She co-wrote "O Baby" with Alexander Kronlund, among three other album tracks. As with her previous two albums, she collaborated with Johan Ekhé and Ulf Lindström, a writing and production duo known as Ghost. The duo produced "O Baby" with additional production from Kronlund and Max Martin. Robyn's vocals were recorded by Ghost at Lifeline Studios in Stockholm and mixing was handled by Ghost, Martin, and Kronlund.

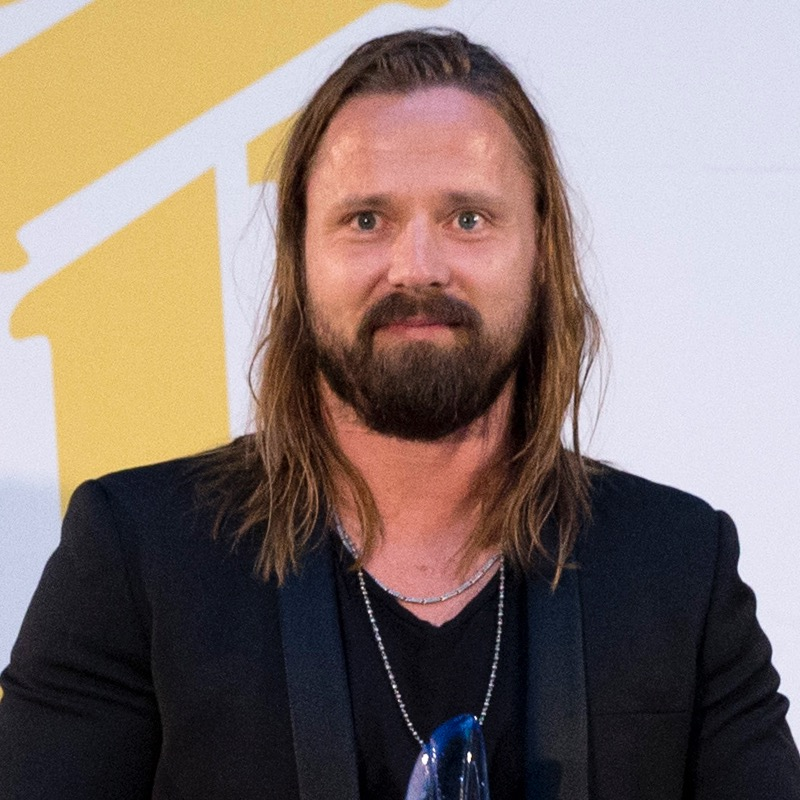
Robyn reunited with Max Martin (pictured in 2015) for "O Baby".

In a profile for Barometern, Robyn disclosed that she consciously factored in commercial appeal in the making of Don't Stop the Music. She viewed "O Baby" as an example of her willingness to take risks, while acknowledging the challenges of balancing marketability and credibility. "O Baby" saw Robyn reuniting with Martin, who contributed to her debut album Robyn Is Here (1995), including the top-ten singles "Do You Know (What It Takes)" (1996) and "Show Me Love" (1997). She declined to work with him on My Truth, but the label brought him back for Don't Stop the Music. Robyn told reporters in 2003 that she made the decision based on his abilities to craft melodies, praising his repertoire. Alex Strehl, her manager at that time, later revealed that the label expected to "come full circle and start something new" by hiring Martin, "but it just did not click". Robyn would not release another project with Martin until "Time Machine" from her 2010 album Body Talk.

BMG Sweden issued "O Baby" as a promotional CD single and sent it to Swedish radio stations in the first half of 2003. Andreas Lindholm designed the single artwork, with additional work by Helen Karnock. The photograph of Robyn was taken by Peter Alendahl. "O Baby" was the second promotional single from Don't Stop the Music distributed to radio stations, following 2002's "Blow My Mind". It was included on several compilations in 2003, including Absolute Music 43, Power Summer Party 2003, and Singles Summer 2003. The song also appears on Robyn's 2006 compilation Det bästa med Robyn.

== Composition ==
"O Baby"
A sample of "O Baby", defined as a "honey ballad" by a Dagens Nyheter critic.

Musically, "O Baby" is a pop song with R&B elements that lasts for four minutes and six seconds. Its instrumentation is provided by bass, grand piano, street organ, and strings. The strings, played by the Stockholm Session Strings, were arranged by Per Ekdahl and recorded by Alar Suurna at Polar Studios. Mats Schubert played the grand piano, and the other instruments were handled by Ghost, Kronlund, and Martin. "O Baby" is a ballad, described by commentators as "calm", "softer", and "sugary", that follows a traditional structure, according to Patrik Andersson from Helsingborgs Dagblad. Writing for AllMusic, John Lucas noted R&B influences throughout Don't Stop the Music but asserted that "O Baby" was "closer to the pop sound [Robyn] was initially famous for". Some commentators likened it to the catalogue of girl group Atomic Kitten. Mattias Dahlström of Dagens Nyheter interpreted "Eclipse", a track on the singer's fourth studio album Robyn (2005), as a sequel to "O Baby" with "significantly lower sugar content".

== Critical reception ==
"O Baby" polarized music critics in the Swedish press. Borås Tidning's Magnus Persson had positive remarks and selected it as one of the strongest tracks on Don't Stop the Music. Olov Baudin of Västerbottens Folkblad declared most of the album mediocre, but praised "O Baby" as a track that succeeded. A Nerikes Allehanda critic viewed it as an R. Kelly-inspired ballad, but felt that it lacked the vital gospel choir of its source material. Calling it "obvious and thin", they deemed it a "lame repeat" of Kelly's work rather than an homage. Dahlström argued in Dagens Nyheter that Don't Stop the Music was streamlined and conceived with commercial success in mind, singling out "O Baby" as a "mass-produced Billboard number-one". Dahlström wrote that while it showcased Robyn's strengths in both marketing and songwriting, they "hoped for more". Similarly, Malin Dahlberg of TT Spektra believed that the song was intended for the commercial market. Reviewing for Sydsvenskan, Fredrik Lindskoug dismissed the track as a "lukewarm triviality" that they could do without on an overall confusing and messy album. Andersson, writing in Helsingborgs Dagblad, considered it one of the album's lowest points. Resumé writer Bobby Svensson, unimpressed with the album's attempts at R&B, was highly critical of "O Baby" and referred to it as an emetic.

== Chart performance ==
"O Baby" received extensive airplay in Sweden in 2003, eventually becoming the second-most-played song of the year by a Swedish act after Per Gessle's "Här kommer alla känslorna", and the fifth-most-played song overall. Despite its radio success, "O Baby" was ineligible to chart on the national Swedish record chart Hitlistan as the single was not commercially available. (Note: From 1975 until 2006, Sweden's national record charts were solely based on physical sales.) On 18 May 2003, the song debuted at number nine on Svensktoppen, a chart compiled by Sveriges Radio and ranked by jury votes. It peaked at number seven the following week and remained in that position for two weeks. The song also appeared on Trackslistan, an influential Swedish radio chart of the 2000s whose methodology was based on votes by listeners. It debuted at number ten on 17 May 2003 and reached its peak at number eight the next week. By the end of 2003, "O Baby" placed at number 74 on Trackslistan's year-end ranking.

== Live performances ==
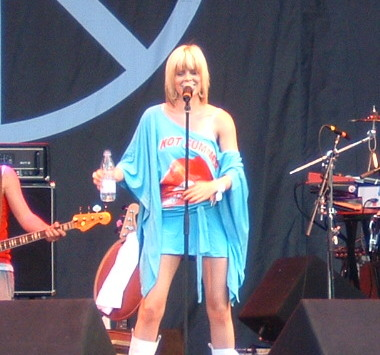
Robyn on her 2003 summer tour, where "O Baby" was performed

Robyn's first televised performance of "O Baby" occurred on Bingolotto's music-themed 2002 New Year's Eve special. Later in 2003, Robyn performed the song on Allsång på Skansen on 8 July in front of a record-setting audience of 36,800. The next week, she sang "O Baby" alongside "Keep This Fire Burning" (2002) at the birthday celebration of Victoria, Crown Princess of Sweden, on 14 July in Borgholm. Anders Nunstedt of Expressen wrote positively of the set, but opined that "O Baby" was too slow. Accompanied by Benny Andersson on the piano, Robyn performed the song at the 2003 opening of Hotel Rival in Stockholm.

"O Baby" was included in the set list for Robyn's 2003 Sweden summer tour, where it was performed during the encore as the penultimate number, preceding a cover of Janet Jackson's "When I Think of You" (1986). Albin Wiberg of Västerviks-Tidningen regarded "O Baby" as a standout of the show, calling it "finely tuned". Robyn toured in the fall of the same year with a slightly altered set list, and again performed the song in the encore. In a review for Sydsvenskan, Anders Jaderup lauded Robyn's vocal performance of "O Baby" and selected it as the highlight of the show. Nunstedt was also positive of the tour rendition of the song, and Andersson from Helsingborgs Dagblad felt the live version was more personal than the studio track. She later staged an acoustic version of the song while touring in 2005 for the album Robyn.

== Credits and personnel ==
Credits are adapted from the liner notes of Don't Stop the Music.

Studios

- Produced, arranged, and recorded at Lifeline Studios (Stockholm)
- Strings and grand piano recorded at Polar Studios (Stockholm)
- Mastered at the Cutting Room (Stockholm)

Personnel

- Robyn – songwriting
- Per Ekdahl – string arrangement
- Björn Engelmann – mastering
- Ghost – arrangement, instruments, mixing, production, recording (vocals)
- Alexander Kronlund – additional production, mixing, songwriting, street organ
- Max Martin – additional production, bass, mixing
- Mats Schubert – grand piano
- Stockholm Session Strings – strings
- Alar Suurna – recording (strings and grand piano)

== Charts ==
Weekly chart performance
Chart (2003)	Peak position
Sweden (Svensktoppen)	7
Sweden (Trackslistan)	8
