= Robyn's Best =

Studio album (reissue) by Robyn
- Released: 1 June 2004
- Label: BMG

Robyn chronology
| Don't Stop the Music (2002) | Robyn's Best (2004) | Robyn (2005) |

Robyn's Best is the reissue of Swedish pop singer Robyn's first studio album Robyn Is Here. It was released by BMG on 1 June 2004 in the United States. While the album is titled like a greatest hits compilation, it is actually just a repackaging of the US edition of Robyn's debut album, Robyn Is Here, with a revised running order and three tracks, "Just Another Girlfriend", "Robyn Is Here" and "I Wish", removed.

== Reception ==
Professional ratings
Review scores
| Source | Rating |
|---|---|
| AllMusic | 2/5 stars |

K. Ross Hoffman of AllMusic calls the reissue "a shamelessly misleading and essentially worthless release that seems misguided even as a straight-up cash-grab attempt".

== Track listing ==
| No. | Title | Music | Producer(s) | Length |
|---|---|---|---|---|
| 1. | "Do You Know (What It Takes)" | Robyn, Denniz Pop, Max Martin, Herbie Crichlow | Pop, Martin | 3:39 |
| 2. | "Do You Really Want Me (Show Respect)" | Robyn, Ulf Lindström, Johan Ekhé | Ulf Lindström, Johan Ekhé | 4:25 |
| 3. | "Show Me Love" | Robyn, Martin | Pop, Martin | 3:47 |
| 4. | "Bumpy Ride" | Robyn, Lindström, Ekhé | Lindström, Ekhé | 4:09 |
| 5. | "In My Heart" | Robyn, Lindström, Ekhé | Lindström, Ekhé | 3:59 |
| 6. | "You've Got That Somethin'" | Robyn, Lindström, Ekhé | Lindström, Ekhé | 3:44 |
| 7. | "Don't Want You Back" | Robyn, Lindström, Ekhé | Lindström, Ekhé | 4:00 |
| 8. | "Here We Go" | Robyn, Anders Bagge, Harry Sommerdahl | Bagge, Sommerdahl | 4:43 |
| 9. | "How" | Robyn, Lindström, Ekhé | Lindström, Ekhé | 4:38 |
| 10. | "The Last Time" | Robyn, Lindström, Ekhé | Lindström, Ekhé | 4:40 |
| Total length: | | | | 41:57 |
