= My Only Reason =

Single by Robyn

from the album My Truth
- B-side: "Det gör ont ibland"
- Released: 22 November 1999
- Studio: Nord Studios (Stockholm)
- Genre: R&B
- Length: 3:58
- Label: BMG Sweden
- Songwriters: Robyn; Billy Mann
- Producers: Billy Mann; K-Fam

Robyn singles chronology
"Play" (1999)	"My Only Reason" (1999)	"Main Thing" (2000)

"My Only Reason" is a song by Swedish singer Robyn from her second studio album My Truth (1999). Robyn wrote the song with Billy Mann, who produced it with Ken "K-Fam" Fambro. It is an R&B song with guitar and piano backing and lyrics about an unhealthy relationship. "My Only Reason" was released as the album's third single on 22 November 1999 through BMG Sweden. The CD single also includes the hip-hop song "Det gör ont ibland" featuring Swedish rapper Petter.

Critics generally praised "My Only Reason". Commercially, the single underperformed on the Swedish singles chart, peaking at number 53 and ending Robyn's streak of top-40 singles. To promote the single, a music video was released and Robyn performed the song live on Sen kväll med Luuk. "My Only Reason" is included on the compilation album Det bästa med Robyn (2006).

== Background and composition ==
Robyn wrote "My Only Reason" with Billy Mann, who produced, arranged, and recorded it with Ken "K-Fam" Fambro at Nord Studios in Stockholm. K-Fam also contributed programming. Johan Ekhé played the bass guitar and Donnie Boynton played the piano, while Mann played the remainder of the instruments. Martin Hansen served as engineer, and Toni Maserati mixed the recording at Polar Studios in Stockholm. Björn Engelmann conducted mastering at the Cutting Room, also in Stockholm. The song features background vocals by Robyn and Mann and lasts for three minutes and fifty-eight seconds.

Musically, "My Only Reason" is an R&B song with instrumentation provided by an acoustic guitar, bass guitar, electric guitar, and piano. The song's lyrics describe an unhealthy relationship where the protagonist remains committed to a partner despite its negative effects. In an interview for Expressen, Robyn elaborated on the song's meaning: "It is about being in love with a person you know you should not be with. This person actually only makes you feel bad. You know that but you say 'Love is my only reason'."

== Release and promotion ==
"My Only Reason" was released on 22 November 1999 as the third single from Robyn's second studio album My Truth (1999), as a CD single by BMG Sweden. The photo of Robyn on the single cover was taken by Carlo Bosco. For the CD release, "My Only Reason" was accompanied by "Det gör ont ibland" as its B-side track. The song, a Swedish-language duet with rapper Petter, also appears on My Truth as a hidden track on the first track's pregap. According to Petter, the song came together quickly despite their different musical styles; he praised her creativity and ability to create melodies. Robyn declared it the "most hip-hop" song she had recorded to date. The song was produced by rapper Thomas Rusiak, with Robyn as co-producer and additional production by Lindström & Ekhé.

The accompanying music video for "My Only Reason", which depicts Robyn in the waiting room of a maternity ward, was filmed in late November 1999. She performed the song on the TV4 late-night talk show Sen kväll med Luuk on 2 December 1999, replacing Prince, who cancelled his appearance at the last minute. Robyn also performed the song while touring in the summer of 2000. As with My Truth and its other singles, "My Only Reason" was left unreleased outside of Sweden due to RCA Records's (Robyn's international label) decision not to distribute the releases abroad. The label management felt the album lacked hit singles and disapproved of some lyrics reflecting on Robyn's 1998 abortion. "My Only Reason" was included on several compilations, including 1999's Absolute Dance 22, and the 2000 albums Mr Music Hits Vol. 1 2000 and Silikon. The song also appears on Robyn's 2006 compilation Det bästa med Robyn, her final release with BMG.

== Reception ==
"My Only Reason" was positively received in the Swedish press. Writing for Aftonbladet, Per Bjurman praised the track in his review, writing that he would not be surprised if listeners fell for the "melodic" and "hard-edged" song. In the same newspaper, Fredrik Virtanen regarded the song a "world hit" and applauded its catchiness. Magnus Persson of Borås Tidning felt Mann's production on My Truth made Robyn anonymous, but applauded his work on "My Only Reason". Lisa Appelqvist from Sydsvenskan lauded the gospel-inspired live performance on tour, and a Nerikes Allehanda writer regarded the song a highlight of the show.

A month after its release as a single, "My Only Reason" debuted on the Swedish singles chart on 30 December 1999 at number 53, which became its peak position. Although the song fell off the chart the following week, it was the most-played-song on Sveriges Radio P3 for the first week of January 2000. It became Robyn's lowest-charting-single on the Swedish singles chart at the time, and her first entry to miss the top 40. It did not match the performances of the album's previous singles "Electric" and "Play" (both 1999), which peaked at numbers 6 and 31, respectively. "My Only Reason" also charted at number 20 on the Trackslistan radio chart.

== Track listing ==
- CD single
1. "My Only Reason" – 3:58
2. "Det gör ont ibland" (featuring Petter) – 4:34

== Credits and personnel ==
Credits are adapted from the liner notes of My Truth.

Studios

- Produced, arranged, and recorded at Nord Studios (Stockholm)
- Mixed at Polar Studios (Stockholm)
- Mastered at the Cutting Room (Stockholm)

Personnel

- Robyn – background vocals, songwriting
- Donnie Boynton – piano
- Johan Ekhé – bass guitar
- Björn Engelmann – mastering
- Ken "K-Fam" Fambro – arrangement, production, programming, recording
- Martin Hansen – engineering
- Billy Mann – arrangement, background vocals, bass, guitar, production, recording, songwriting
- Toni Maserati – mixing

== Charts ==
Weekly chart performance
Chart (1999)	Peak position
Sweden (Sverigetopplistan)	53

== Release history ==
Release dates and formats
Region	Date	Format	Label	Ref.
Sweden	22 November 1999	CD	BMG Sweden	
