= Electric (Robyn song) =

Single by Robyn

from the album My Truth
- Released: 12 April 1999
- Studio: Lifeline Studios (Stockholm)
- Genre: Electronic funk
- Length: 5:09
- Label: BMG Sweden
- Songwriters: Robyn; Ulf Lindström; Johan Ekhé
- Producers: Lindström & Ekhé

Robyn singles chronology
"Show Me Love" (1997)	"Electric" (1999)	"Play" (1999)

"Electric" is a song by Swedish singer Robyn from her second studio album, My Truth (1999). It was released as the album's lead single on 12 April 1999 by BMG Sweden. Robyn wrote the track in collaboration with its producers Ulf Lindström and Johan Ekhé. The single artwork features the singer wearing a feather headpiece designed by Sebastian Wahl. Musically, "Electric" is an electronic funk song, and the lyrics address unexpected life events that make one feel alive.

"Electric" was hailed by music critics as a highlight on My Truth. It achieved commercial success in Sweden, with a peak position of number six on the Hitlistan chart and a gold certification by the Swedish Recording Industry Association (GLF). Though it was initially planned to be serviced internationally, "Electric" and its parent album were not released outside of Sweden due to a dispute between Robyn and her overseas label RCA Records.

== Background and composition ==
"Electric"
A sample of "Electric", an electronic funk track about unexpected life events.

"Electric" was written by Robyn, Ulf Lindström and Johan Ekhé. Lindström and Ekhé recorded Robyn's vocals and produced the track at Lifeline Studios in Stockholm, Sweden. Lindström and Patrik Berger played the guitar, while all other instruments as well as mixing were handled by Lindström and Ekhé. Hernan "Boogie" Donoso served as an assistant engineer and Björn Engelmann mastered the song at Cutting Room Studios in Stockholm. "Electric" is an electronic funk song with elements of R&B and reggae music. The instrumentation features electric spark sound effects and the lyrics use positive and negative energy as metaphors for the close relationship between love and hate. In a chat room provided by Swedish tabloid newspaper Aftonbladet, Robyn elaborated on the lyrical matter of the song when asked by a fan; she stated that it is about unexpected events in life, both good and bad, that are "fantastic" and make one feel alive.

== Release and promotion ==
"Electric" was sent to Swedish radio stations on 22 March 1999. Robyn first performed the song on the televised Miss Sweden beauty pageant at the Stockholm Concert Hall on 27 March 1999. The single was released on 12 April 1999 in CD format by BMG Sweden, as the lead single for the singer's second studio effort My Truth (1999). Eric Broms photographed the single cover art which features Robyn wearing a feather headpiece designed by Sebastian Wahl. The single release contains both the radio edit and the extended album version, which includes a 90-second intro. The maxi single includes the radio edit and remixes by Mad Professor, Internal Dread and Berger. A music video was made to promote the single. The video is set in a club where Robyn, wearing all-white clothing, is dancing and singing in the centre. It premiered on 16 May 1999 during the broadcast of the documentary Robyn – ingen vanlig Carlsson on SVT1.

RCA Records, Robyn's international label at the time, planned to release "Electric" in the United States in September 1999, followed by the album in January 2000. The label wanted Robyn to re-record portions of the album as certain aspects reflected on the singer's abortion, a topic deemed unsuitable for the American market and pop radio. When she refused to make alterations, the two parties were unable to reach a compromise and My Truth and its singles were left unreleased outside of Sweden.

== Reception ==
"Electric" received favorable reviews from music critics. While reviewing My Truth, a writer for Nöjesguiden particularly commended the single and "Main Thing". The writer praised the extended intro of "Electric", calling the first 90 seconds "magical". John Lucas of AllMusic deemed the single a stand-out and described it as "distinctive" and "minimal". A Smålandsposten critic also selected it as one of the best tracks on the album. Aftonbladet's Per Bjurman praised the electronic funk sound. Göteborgs-Posten's Patrik Lindgren appreciated that the album was not fitted to the American market, which he found apparent with "Electric".

"Electric" made its debut on the Hitlistan singles chart at number eight on 22 April 1999. The next week, it ascended to acquire a peak position at number six. It became Robyn's third top-ten single on the chart, following "Do You Really Want Me (Show Respect)" and "Do You Know (What It Takes)". "Electric" stayed in the top-ten for four weeks, and remained on the chart for fourteen weeks in total. On 18 May 1999, it received a gold certification by the Swedish Recording Industry Association (GLF) for sales of 15,000 units. The single was placed at number 53 on the chart's year-end list of 1999. The track was the sixth most-played song of 1999 on Sveriges Radio P3.

== Track listings ==
- CD single
1. "Electric" (radio edit) – 3:46
2. "Electric" (extended) – 5:09
- CD maxi single
1. "Electric" (radio edit) – 3:46
2. "Electric" (Mad Professor Shocking mix) – 5:14
3. "Electric" (Mad Professor High Voltage dub) – 5:18
4. "Electric" (Rub-A-Dub Roots dub) – 4:41
5. "Electric" (Patrik Berger Alchemist remix) – 5:52

== Credits and personnel ==
Credits are adapted from the liner notes of "Electric".

Recording

- Produced, arranged, recorded and mixed at Lifeline Studios (Stockholm, Sweden)
- Mastered at Cutting Room Studios (Stockholm, Sweden)

Personnel

- Robyn – songwriting
- Ulf Lindström – arrangement, guitar, instruments, mixing, production, recording
- Johan Ekhé – arrangement, instruments, mixing, production, recording
- Patrik Berger – guitar
- Hernan "Boogie" Donoso – assistant engineering
- Björn Engelmann – mastering

== Charts ==
=== Weekly charts ===
Chart (1999)	Peak position
Sweden (Sverigetopplistan)	6

=== Year-end charts ===
Chart (1999)	Position
Sweden (Hitlistan)	53

== Certifications ==
Region	Certification	Certified units/sales
Sweden (GLF)	Gold	15,000^{^}
^{^} Shipments figures based on certification alone.

== Release history ==
"Electric" release history
Region	Date	Format	Label	Ref.
Sweden	22 March 1999	Radio airplay	BMG Sweden	
Sweden	12 April 1999	CD single; CD maxi single	BMG Sweden	
