= Don't Stop the Music =

Don't Stop the Music may refer to:

== Albums ==
- Don't Stop the Music (Play album) (2004)
- Don't Stop the Music (Robyn album) (2002)
- Don't Stop the Music, a 2000 album by Kojo Antwi
- Don't Stop the Music, a 1977 album by Brecker Brothers
- Don't Stop the Music, a 1988 album by Del McCoury
- Don't Stop the Music, a 1976 album by Supermax
- Don't Stop the Music, a 2007 EP by Kava Kava
- Don't Stop the Music, a 1966 EP by the Lee Kings

== Songs ==
- "Don't Stop the Music" (George Jones song) (1957)
- "Don't Stop the Music" (Lionel Richie song) (2000)
- "Don't Stop the Music" (Rihanna song) (2007)
- "Don't Stop the Music" (Robyn song) (2002)
- "Don't Stop the Music" (Yarbrough and Peoples song) (1980)
- "Don't Stop the Music", a 1975 song by the Bay City Rollers from Wouldn't You Like It?
- "Don't Stop the Music", a 2004 song by DJ Kay Slay from The Streetsweeper, Vol. 2
- "Don't Stop the Music", a 2002 song by Eriko Imai
- "Don't Stop the Music", a 2012 song by Lisa Maffia
- "Don't Stop the Music", a 2004 song by Riyu Kosaka from Begin

== Other uses ==
- Don't Stop The Music (TV series), a 2018 three-part Australian documentary series

== See also ==
- Stop the Music (disambiguation)
