= Don't Stop the Music (Robyn song) =

Single by Robyn

from the album Don't Stop the Music
- Released: 20 January 2003
- Studio: Lifeline Studios (Stockholm)
- Genre: Pop
- Length: 3:27
- Label: BMG Sweden
- Songwriters: Remee; Alexander Kronlund; Robyn; Ulf Lindström; Johan Ekhé
- Producer: Ghost

Robyn singles chronology
"Keep This Fire Burning" (2002)	"Don't Stop the Music" (2003)	"Be Mine!" (2005)

"Don't Stop the Music" is a song by Swedish singer Robyn from her third studio album Don't Stop the Music (2002). It was released as the album's second and final single on 20 January 2003 through BMG in Sweden, and serviced elsewhere in Europe by Jive in March. Ulf Lindström and Johan Ekhé of production duo Ghost produced the song, and wrote it with Robyn, Remee, and Alexander Kronlund. A pop track with rock-influenced guitar riffs, its lyrics focus on self-empowerment, which Robyn stated aligned with the album's overall theme.

"Don't Stop the Music" received mixed reviews from music critics but proved commercially successful. It peaked at number seven on the Sverigetopplistan singles chart and achieved considerable airplay, ranking among the most-played songs on Swedish radio during the 2000s. The single also reached the top 20 in Norway and charted moderately in Belgium, the Netherlands, and Romania. The music video was filmed in November 2002 in Cape Town, where the shoot was temporarily halted after causing disturbances in a residential area. In 2004, girl group Play covered the song for its studio album Don't Stop the Music.

== Background and composition ==
Robyn began writing for her third studio album Don't Stop the Music (2002) after signing an international record deal with Jive in 2001. Her second studio album My Truth (1999) was left unreleased outside of Sweden because of a dispute with RCA, her international label at the time. While making Don't Stop the Music, she consciously factored in commercial appeal and intended for the album to relaunch her career in North America. She described balancing the commercial aspects and credibility as both difficult and challenging. Departing from her R&B influences, Robyn sought a "harder", more guitar-based sound than her earlier records, and aimed to keep production simple and stripped down.

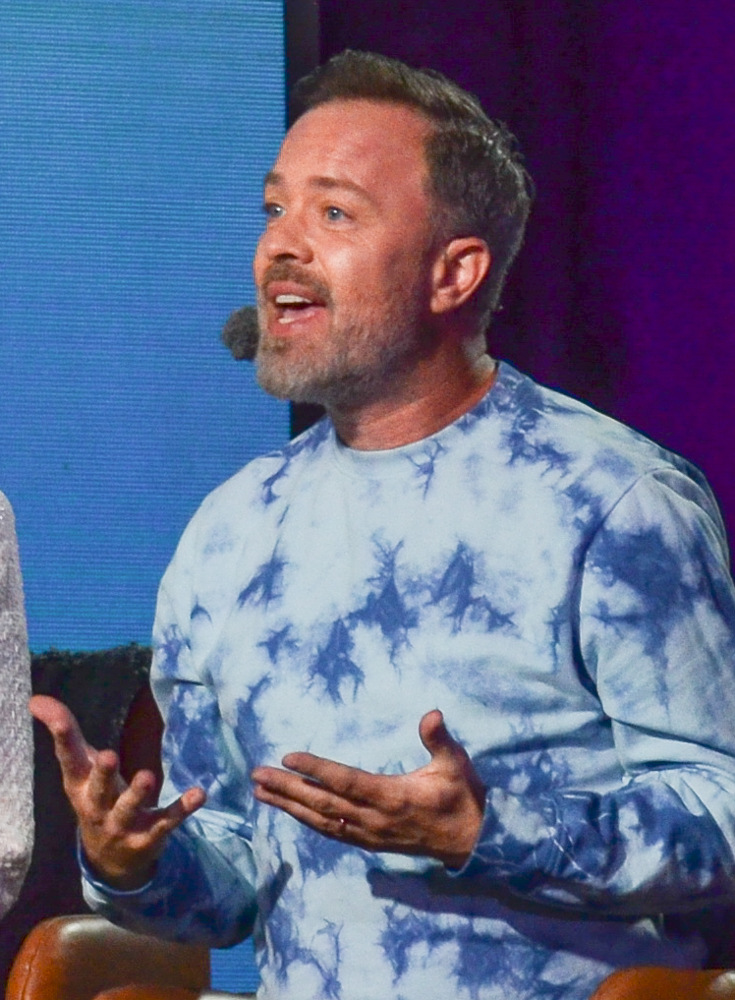
Alexander Kronlund (pictured in 2022) co-wrote "Don't Stop the Music".

As with her previous two studio efforts, Robyn worked with Johan Ekhé and Ulf Lindström, a writing and production duo known as Ghost. She collaborated more extensively on songwriting for Don't Stop the Music than on her previous albums, and co-wrote the title track with Remee, Alexander Kronlund, and Ghost, who also produced it. In an interview, Robyn explained that the lyrics of the song reflect the album's overarching theme of self-empowerment: "The entire album, and especially the title track, is about believing in yourself even if no one else is. Going your own way. It's worth it in the end." Ghost handled the arrangement and played all instruments. Robyn's vocals were recorded by Ghost at Lifeline Studios in Stockholm and mixing was done by Ghost, Max Martin, and Rami Yacoub.

Musically, "Don't Stop the Music" is a pop song with funk and rock elements. It opens with a guitar riff, and has a duration of three minutes and 27 seconds. The instrumentation features a rock groove and vibrating bassline. The lyrics are empowering and positive in nature, and the chorus contains the lines "Don't stop the music / The world will keep turning if you use it" and "Don't stop the music / People keep on dancing / You can do it / Baby come on". In the bridge, Robyn sings "Music like love floating in the air / You can reach out grab it everywhere". In a review for AllMusic, John Lucas noted that while the album leans more toward R&B, "Don't Stop the Music" is closer to the pop sound of the singer's earlier material. Tony Ernst of Göteborgs-Posten compared the song to works by Madonna, and Mikael Wikman of Västerbottningen likened its "rockier" influences to the music of Pink.

== Release and critical reception ==
"Don't Stop the Music" was originally selected as the album's lead single and scheduled to be serviced to European radio stations on 15 July 2002. The release was cancelled, and "Keep This Fire Burning" was instead chosen as the first single and sent to Swedish radio in August. "Don't Stop the Music" was subsequently announced as the second single in November 2002. BMG Sweden first issued a promotional CD single and distributed it to Swedish radio stations in the last week of November. The CD single was commercially released in Sweden on 20 January 2003 by BMG. The two-track single consists of the main mix and the instrumental version. In addition to the original track, the maxi single also contains remixes by Ghost, Cherno Jah, Rigo Perez, and Twin. Jive distributed the single throughout Europe; the maxi single was released in Germany on 3 March 2003.

"Don't Stop the Music" received mixed reviews from music critics. Borås Tidning's Magnus Persson selected it as one of the strongest tracks on the album, while Lucas from AllMusic picked it as a highlight. Anders Nunstedt of Expressen considered it a personal favorite from the album, praising its catchiness. Malin Dahlberg of TT Spektra described its "infectious energy" as comparable to that of "Keep This Fire Burning". In contrast, Fredrik Lindskoug of Sydsvenskan, gave the song a negative review, calling it a "pointless pop song". Similarly, Dagensskiva.com critic Ola Andersson considered it one of the weakest tracks on Don't Stop the Music, deeming it flat and boring. Ernst wrote in Göteborgs-Posten that the song lacked originality and viewed it as a "straight up" replica of Madonna's work.

== Chart performance ==
On 12 January 2003, "Don't Stop the Music" became the first song not sung in Swedish to be played on Svensktoppen, a weekly radio chart and programme run by Sveriges Radio, after it changed its rules to allow songs in other languages. The song debuted in the top position on the chart, based on jury votes, and charted for six weeks in total. The song also charted on Trackslistan, another radio chart based on votes by listeners, reaching number two. It received significant airplay in 2003 and was the tenth-most-played song of the year on Swedish radio. In December 2009, STIM published a list of the most-played songs by Swedish songwriters on Swedish radio in the 2000s, with "Don't Stop the Music" placing ninth.

Following its commercial release, "Don't Stop the Music" debuted and peaked at number seven on the Sverigetopplistan singles chart on 30 January 2003, becoming her fourth top-ten single in Sweden. By the end of 2003, the song placed at number 52 on the chart's year-end ranking. It was a top-20 hit in Norway in September 2003, reaching number 19 on the VG-lista chart. In Belgium, the song entered the Ultratip Bubbling Under charts in both Flanders and Wallonia, peaking at numbers twelve and three, respectively. In Romania, "Don't Stop the Music" achieved its peak position at number 53 and charted for seven weeks. The song appeared in the lower regions of the Dutch Single Top 100 for four weeks and reached number 85.

== Music video ==
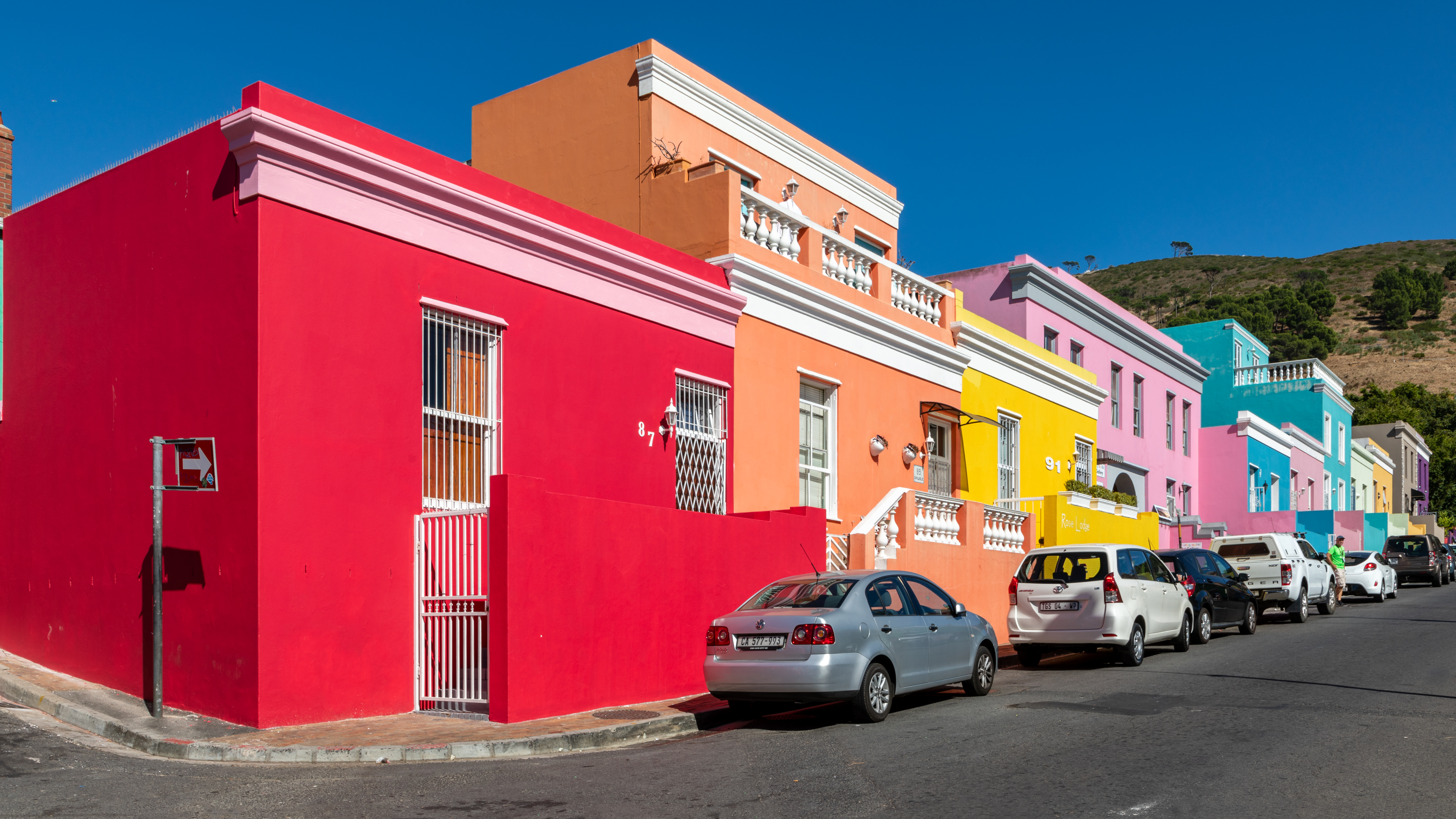
The music video for "Don't Stop the Music" was shot in the Bo-Kaap in Cape Town.

Robyn traveled to South Africa on 18 November 2002 to shoot the music video for "Don't Stop the Music". Production took place on location in the Bo-Kaap residential area of Cape Town. The video was directed by Bernard Wedig and Conchita Soares of German production company Blow Film. The shoot was temporarily halted after an imam from a nearby mosque demanded that filming be moved elsewhere. Although the production crew had the necessary permit to shoot in the area, the imam believed the activity caused a disturbance during Ramadan. Filming resumed after negotiations, with the crew keeping the volume down and avoiding shooting during prayer times. Robyn told Expressen while on set that she did not regret filming in the area and hoped that local residents were not too disturbed by the presence of her and the crew.

The video opens with Robyn exiting a yellow building in a residential area and making her way down the street. She plays a game in which she avoids stepping on cracks in the pavement, causing her to jump, dance, and move acrobatically. As the first chorus begins, she balances along a narrow stone wall before front-flipping down from it. During the second chorus, she continues leaping through a cobblestone street and later runs horizontally along a wall to avoid obstacles. She crosses a busy downtown street by jumping across the hoods of moving cars and ultimately reaches a newsstand, where she buys a newspaper as the video ends.

According to Expressen, the shoot was completed quickly and on a relatively low budget of less than one million Swedish kronor. Robyn performed her own stunts using a harness and wires that suspended her above the ground, with the equipment supplied by a local strip club. Although she enjoyed performing the stunts herself, she bruised easily during filming and experienced intense muscle pain, which had to be relieved between takes by a masseuse. The video premiered on television in mid-December 2002.

== Live performances and cover version ==
Robyn performed "Don't Stop the Music" on 9 December 2002 on Faddergalan, a charity event broadcast live on TV4. The song appeared twice in the set list for Robyn's 2003 Sweden summer tour: first as a slowed reggae version with a backbeat early in the show, and later as the original album version near the end. During the reggae rendition, she changed out of a jumpsuit to reveal a T-shirt and short skirt, also switching her sneakers for white boots. Albin Wiberg of Västerviks-Tidningen deemed the reggae flourishes a standout of the show, while Upsala Nya Tidning's Jonas Kihlander described the version as "strange", and Östersunds-Posten's Maria Ahlsten questioned the mid-performance costume change. Robyn toured again later that year with a revised set list, performing the song in the encore. In 2005, she performed an electropop and percussion-heavy version of the song while touring in support of her fourth studio album Robyn.

In 2004, Swedish girl group Play recorded a cover version and titled its third studio album Don't Stop the Music after the song. The cover, produced by Peter Kvint, received mixed reviews in the American press, with criticism focused on its production. Judy Jarvis of the Lancaster New Era asserted that the song "just hurts my feelings with its synthesizer version of an electric guitar and over-annunciated [sic] words", while Scott Koerwer of the Courier-Post stated that "the title track pretends to incorporate guitars. In reality, however, they're just synthesized noise." John Everson offered a positive review in the Southtown Star and lauded the cover's catchiness and production, calling it "the true standout" of the album.

== Track listing ==
- CD single
1. "Don't Stop the Music" (main mix) – 3:29
2. "Don't Stop the Music" (instrumental version) – 3:29
- Maxi CD single
1. "Don't Stop the Music" (main mix) – 3:29
2. "Don't Stop the Music" (Ghost PM remix) – 3:45
3. "Don't Stop the Music" (Cherno Jah remix) – 3:50
4. "Don't Stop the Music" (Rigo Perez remix) – 3:36
5. "Don't Stop the Music" (Twin radio edit) – 3:25
6. "Don't Stop the Music" (Twin full vocal 12" mix) – 6:03

== Credits and personnel ==
Credits are adapted from the liner notes of Don't Stop the Music.

Studios

- Produced, arranged, recorded, and mixed at Lifeline Studios (Stockholm)
- Mastered at the Cutting Room (Stockholm)

Personnel

- Robyn – songwriting
- Johan Ekhé – songwriting
- Björn Engelmann – mastering
- Ghost – arrangement, instruments, mixing, production, recording
- Alexander Kronlund – songwriting
- Ulf Lindström – songwriting
- Max Martin – mixing
- Rami – mixing
- Remee – songwriting

== Charts ==
=== Weekly charts ===
Weekly chart performance
Chart (2003)	Peak position
Belgium (Ultratip Bubbling Under Flanders)	12
Belgium (Ultratip Bubbling Under Wallonia)	3
Netherlands (Single Top 100)	85
Norway (VG-lista)	19
Romania (Romanian Top 100)	53
Sweden (Sverigetopplistan)	7

=== Year-end charts ===
Year-end chart performance
Chart (2003)	Position
Sweden (Sverigetopplistan)	52

== Release history ==
Release dates and formats
Region	Date	Format(s)	Label(s)	Ref.
Sweden	20 January 2003	CD; maxi CD	BMG Sweden	
Germany	3 March 2003	Maxi CD	Jive	
France	11 March 2003	Maxi CD	Jive	
