= Keep This Fire Burning =

2002 single by Robyn

Single by Robyn

from the album Don't Stop the Music
- Released: 16 September 2002
- Length: 3:55
- Label: RCA; BMG
- Songwriters: Robyn; Remee; Ulf Lindström; Johan Ekhé
- Producer: Ghost

Robyn singles chronology
"Main Thing" (2000)	"Keep This Fire Burning" (2002)	"Don't Stop the Music" (2003)

"Keep This Fire Burning" is a song by Swedish recording artist Robyn, released as the first single from her third album Don't Stop the Music. The single was released in Sweden on 16 September 2002, where it became her highest charting single since 1995's "Do You Really Want Me (Show Respect)". The song was also released as a single in Australia under the name "By Your Side" due to the Australian bushfires which were happening at the time. In 2008, a re-recorded version of the song appeared on the special edition of Robyn's eponymous album.

British soul singer Beverley Knight released a cover of the song in 2004.

== Track listings ==
CD single

1. "Keep This Fire Burning" (Radio Original) – 3:52
2. "Keep This Fire Burning" (Instrumental) – 3:52

CD maxi single and Australian CD single

1. "Keep This Fire Burning" (Radio Original) – 3:52
2. "Keep This Fire Burning" (Cherno Jah Remix) – 4:12
3. "Keep This Fire Burning" (Martin Landquist 2002 Remix) – 4:16
4. "Keep This Fire Burning" (Twin 12" Club Mix) – 7:24
5. "Keep This Fire Burning" (Ingrosso & Father Remix) – 7:18
6. "Keep This Fire Burning" (DJ Benji Remix) – 5:51

== Personnel ==
- Written by Robyn, Remee, Ulf Lindström, Johan Ekhé
- Produced, arranged, recorded, mixed and instruments performed by Ghost

== Charts ==
=== Weekly charts ===
Chart (2002–03)	Peak position
Belgium (Ultratop 50 Flanders)	24
Belgium (Ultratop 50 Wallonia)	22
Denmark (Tracklisten)	7
France (SNEP)	37
Netherlands (Dutch Top 40)	33
Netherlands (Single Top 100)	52
Norway (VG-lista)	19
Romania (Romanian Top 100)	19
Sweden (Sverigetopplistan)	3

=== Year-end charts ===
Chart (2002)	Position
Sweden (Sverigetopplistan)	18

== Beverley Knight version ==
"Keep This Fire Burning"

Single by Beverley Knight

from the album Affirmation
- Released: 14 March 2005
- Length: 3:56
- Label: Parlophone
- Songwriters: Robyn; Remee; Ulf Lindström; Johan Ekhé
- Producer: Ghost

Beverley Knight singles chronology
"Not Too Late for Love" (2004)	"Keep This Fire Burning" (2005)	"Piece of My Heart" (2006)

Live video
- "Keep This Fire Burning" on YouTube

British soul singer Beverley Knight recorded a cover version of "Keep This Fire Burning" and released it as the third and final single from her fourth studio album, Affirmation (2004), on 14 March 2005. The production of the song, handled by Ghost, used the exact same instrumental as Robyn's original version, with slight mixing differences and additional orchestration by the Stockholm Session Strings. Included on the CD single release were mixes from Stargate (which sampled a portion of Robyn's original vocals) and Full Phat (featuring a rap from Estelle). "Keep This Fire Burning" became Knight's sixth top-20 solo single in the UK, reaching number 16.

=== Track listings ===
- CD1
1. "Keep This Fire Burning" (Album Version)
2. "Keep This Fire Burning" (Full Phatt Mix) (Feat. Estelle)
- CD2
1. "Keep This Fire Burning" (Album Version)
2. "Keep This Fire Burning" (Boris Dlugosch & Michi Lange Club Mix)
3. "I Was Meant for You"
4. "Soon Come"
5. "Keep This Fire Burning" (Music Video)
- 12-inch vinyl
1. "Keep This Fire Burning" (Album Version)
2. "Keep This Fire Burning" (Boris Dlugosch & Michi Lange Dub Mix)
3. "Keep This Fire Burning" (Full Phatt Mix) (Feat. Estelle)
4. "Keep This Fire Burning" (Stargate Club Mix)

=== Personnel ===
- Written by Robyn, Remee, Ulf Lindström, Johan Ekhé
- Produced, arranged, recorded and mixed by Ghost
- All vocals by Beverley Knight
- String arrangement by Per Ekdahl
- Strings performed by Stockholm Session Strings at Cosmos Studios, Stockholm
- All other instruments by Ghost

=== Charts ===
==== Weekly charts ====
Weekly chart performance for "Keep This Fire Burning" by Beverley Knight
Chart (2005)	Peak position
Belgium (Ultratip Bubbling Under Flanders)	4
Germany (GfK)	94
Russia Airplay (TopHit)	27
Scotland Singles (OCC)	18
UK Singles (OCC)	16
UK Hip Hop/R&B (OCC)	4

==== Year-end charts ====
Year-end chart performance for "Keep This Fire Burning" by Beverley Knight
Chart (2005)	Position
Russia Airplay (TopHit)	135

== Other versions ==
In 2008, British dance act Outsiders released a dance cover of the song with vocals by Amanda Wilson. The track was then remixed by Wawa and then again by Freemasons, who also collaborated with Wilson on various tracks such as "Watchin'". This version peaked at #80 in the UK.
