= My Truth =

Studio album by Robyn
- Released: 17 May 1999
- Recorded: c. 1998–1999
- Studio: Cosmos Studios; Lifeline Studios; Nord Studios; Polar Studios; Rub-A-Dub Studio; Soundtrade Studios (Stockholm); Doppler Studios (Atlanta)
- Genre: Pop; R&B; soul
- Length: 62:47
- Label: BMG Sweden
- Producer: Christian Falk; Internal Dread; Cherno Jah; K-Fam; Lindström & Ekhé; Billy Mann; Masters at Work; Robyn; Thomas Rusiak

Robyn chronology
Robyn Is Here (1995)	My Truth (1999)	Don't Stop the Music (2002)

Singles from My Truth
- 1. "Electric" Released: 12 April 1999; 2. "Play" Released: 5 July 1999; 3. "My Only Reason" Released: 22 November 1999; 4. "Main Thing" Released: 4 December 2000

My Truth is the second studio album by Swedish singer Robyn. It was released on 17 May 1999 by BMG Sweden. Robyn collaborated with the producers Lindström & Ekhé, Christian Falk, Ken Fambro, Billy Mann, Thomas Rusiak, and Masters at Work, with guest vocals from rapper Petter and singers Cindy and Titiyo. A pop, R&B, and soul record, My Truth is an autobiographical album for which Robyn co-wrote all fourteen songs. Some of its lyrics reflect on the singer's fall 1998 abortion, which became controversial when RCA Records began planning a North American release. When Robyn refused to change the album after the label's request, plans to release My Truth outside Sweden were cancelled.

Swedish music critics generally praised My Truth, commending Robyn's growth as a songwriter and vocalist, although the production of some tracks received criticism. At the 2000 Grammis, it was nominated for Album of the Year and won the Best Female Pop/Rock award. Overseas critics were divided in their opinions of the record; they found it more mature than the singer's debut album, Robyn Is Here (1995), but noted that it lacked catchy hooks. My Truth peaked at number two on the Swedish albums chart and was certified platinum by the Swedish Recording Industry Association (GLF). Four singles were released from the album: "Electric", "Play", "My Only Reason", and "Main Thing". "Electric", the lead single, peaked at number six on the Swedish singles chart and was certified gold, while the remainder of the singles saw little commercial success.

== Background ==
Robyn's debut studio album Robyn Is Here was released in Sweden in 1995, and was followed by a North American release two years later. The album sold 1.5 million copies worldwide, according to BMG Sweden, and yielded the top-ten singles "Do You Know (What It Takes)" (1996) and "Show Me Love" (1997), both co-produced by Max Martin. Robyn Is Here proved successful in the United States, where it was certified platinum by the Recording Industry Association of America (RIAA) for shipments of one million copies. She spent nearly 12 months on tour in North America and returned to Sweden in 1998. She told Billboard, "I returned [to Stockholm] from my year in the U.S. [and] I was so extremely tired of everything, including myself and my music."

While touring in the US, Robyn had a "nervous breakdown" during a live performance in Chicago, which ended with her manager pinning her down in her dressing room. She viewed the incident as a sign of wanting to change her career and image; she felt that the image her label had created of a stereotypical "young, blonde spunky girl" did not properly represent her. Burned out, the singer took several months off after returning to Sweden. Encouraged to become "her own" after the Chicago incident, Robyn began working on a second studio effort to be titled My Truth. She did not want to repeat herself with "another Robyn record", opting to follow her intuition and experiment instead. She declined to work with Martin again, enlisting Ulf Lindström, Johan Ekhé, Christian Falk, Billy Mann, Cherno Jah, Masters at Work, Ken Fambro, and Internal Dread as producers; she had collaborated with Lindström, Ekhé, and Falk on Robyn Is Here.

== Writing and production ==
I feel more safe about myself and my music now, and I've become more focused on maintaining a positive whole on the record, even though certain songs that I write are rather sad.

—Robyn about My Truth, June 1999

Robyn co-wrote all of My Truth's fourteen tracks. Although the singer returned to Sweden from North America in the summer of 1998, she returned to the US several times to work on the album. Several songwriters gave Robyn completed songs to record, but she considered it important to contribute to the writing process and said that most of the songs on My Truth originated with her. The album was written in four months. Robyn collaborated with a variety of producers, saying that she played around with the album's concept and was willing to experiment with different musical styles. Tired of the R&B of Robyn Is Here, the singer decided to explore house and rock music. About the album's title, she told Nerikes Allehanda that its songs expressed what was important to her and reflected her "truth" at the time.

Although the singer wanted My Truth to be positive in spirit, she acknowledged that "some sadness [is] expressed": "Every song is about something I've been through that I think is important to talk about. I have tried to turn these experiences into inspiring songs about my life." Robyn had an abortion in the fall of 1998, which she publicly disclosed several months later in an issue of Café. She wrote "Giving You Back" in February 1999, to help her cope with the abortion; when the album was completed, the singer called it one of the best songs she had written to date. Robyn began using songwriting as a coping mechanism during the production of Robyn Is Here, when she wrote "In My Heart" about her parents' divorce. She decided to have the abortion after much soul-searching. In a May 1999 Aftonbladet interview, the singer said that she would not wish an abortion on anyone because of the pain it caused her. Following the interview, Robyn experienced a backlash by some who felt that she impeded female liberation with her comments. In an August 1999 interview, the singer said that she wanted to draw attention to the abortion debate rather than her personal life. Although she supported abortion rights, Robyn acknowledged that the decision is a serious matter and should be treated as such.

The majority of My Truth was recorded at different studios in Stockholm, including Cosmos Studios and Polar Studios. Recording sessions also took place at Doppler Studios in Atlanta. Robyn asked her manager to enlist a house producer for the project after "falling in love" with New York culture in 1997. The following year, she began working with Little Louie Vega and Kenny "Dope" Gonzalez of Masters at Work. Although Robyn initially found it difficult to sing at a house tempo, she called it "liberating" when she became accustomed to it. After two weeks in the studio, "Main Thing" and "Good Thang" were completed. The former was chosen for the album, and the latter would be released as the B-side of a single. She joined Swedish rapper Petter for "Det gör ont ibland", a Swedish-language duet, after they visited a friend's country home. According to Petter, the song came together quickly despite their different musical styles. It was produced by rapper Thomas Rusiak, with Robyn as co-producer and additional production by Lindström & Ekhé. She recorded "Healthy Love", another duet, with Cindy Heinold for the album. Photographer Eric Broms provided the artwork for My Truth, which sees Robyn wearing a feather headpiece designed by Sebastian Wahl.

== Music and lyrics ==
"Electric"
A sample of the lead single, "Electric", an electronic funk track called "distinctive" and "minimal" by critics.

"Giving You Back"
A sample of "Giving You Back", a ballad about Robyn's abortion which was praised by critics.

Described as an autobiographical album, My Truth is a pop, R&B and soul record. About its mature tone, Robyn said that she had grown up since releasing her debut album and had gained life experiences which she wanted to express. She described the album's musical styles as more intense than those on Robyn Is Here, but retaining a mainstream appeal. She said, "This album is different from my first ... All the songs on this album are different from each other and show different sides of me." John Lucas of AllMusic called the album "hardly a radical departure" from Robyn Is Here, but more mature with "intelligent and introspective" lyrics and greater focus on its lyrical content. Vulture's Larry Fitzmaurice declared it "part continuation of Robyn Is Here's R&B-pop palette and part stylistic divergence into more subtle, chillout-inflected territory".

"Det gör ont ibland", with Petter, is a hidden track on the first track's pregap. Robyn described the duet as the "most hip hop" song she had recorded to date. Aftonbladet's Per Bjurman described "Play" (the first track) as world music-tinged, and Lucas called it "as playful a song as [Robyn]'s ever recorded". It is followed by the R&B song "My Only Reason", whose lyrics describe a bad relationship. Next is "Underneath the Heart", a piano-guitar-and-string ballad whose lyrics describe the desire to help someone else feel better, which was compared by critics to the catalogue of American singer Toni Braxton. The fourth track, "Electric", is an electronic funk song with reggae elements; it uses positive and negative energy as metaphors for the close relationship between love and hate. The extended album version includes a 90-second intro. The title track has a "convinced relativism", according to Robert Christgau, and Robyn wrote the song in 1997 about feeling misunderstood. The sixth song, "Main Thing" (which samples Shot's 1986 single of the same name), explores the deep house, disco and funk genres. Robyn wrote the song about an ex-boyfriend in February 1999, while she was working with Masters at Work in New York.

The lyrics of the ragga-infused "Healthy Love", featuring Cindy, describe feeling vulnerable in a new relationship due to bad experiences in previous ones. "Monday Morning", an acoustic pop song, was designated by Bjurman as a "singer-songwriter visa". The lyrics describe feeling down after a fun weekend with lines such as "Will you still love me on Monday morning?" The ninth track, "Giving You Back", is a piano ballad which addresses Robyn's abortion: "I'm giving you back to where you came from but I'm not forgetting who you are". David Schmader of The Stranger wrote that the song has a directness "unprecedented in pop", and compared its piano elements to those in Braxton's work. The following track, "88 Days", has a pop and R&B sound and includes backing vocals from Titiyo. Robyn and Mann co-wrote it during winter, when spring was about 88 days away and they longed for sunshine. According to Lucas, its lyrics also refer to the singer's abortion. "Long Gone" is a ballad with string and guitar instrumentation, the last lines of which were taken from dialogue in the film Contact (1997). The penultimate track, "Not on the Inside", is an acoustic pop song. Robyn stated that the song is about individuals who "don't have a good grip on their lives ... but pretend they do". The thirteenth and final track, the drum and bass-influenced "Universal Woman" (for which Robyn received sole writing credit), was written in ten minutes in a London hotel room. She singer said that the song is about girl power; women can be regarded as "strong", even if they "sacrifice" everything for love.

== Release ==
My Truth premiered on the Torget.se website, where three songs were uploaded daily beginning on 14 May 1999. The album was released three days later (on 17 May) by BMG Sweden. The label held back on releasing the album abroad until they could present a "success story" to international distributors. My Truth debuted at number two on the Swedish albums chart and was certified gold by the Swedish Recording Industry Association (GLF), for sales of 40,000 copies on 18 May—the day after its release. The album sold 50,000 copies in its first four weeks, and remained on the album chart for 27 non-consecutive weeks (11 of them in the top 10). On 1 October 1999, My Truth was certified platinum by the GLF for sales of 80,000 copies. In 2001, Billboard reported that the album had sold over 130,000 copies in Sweden.

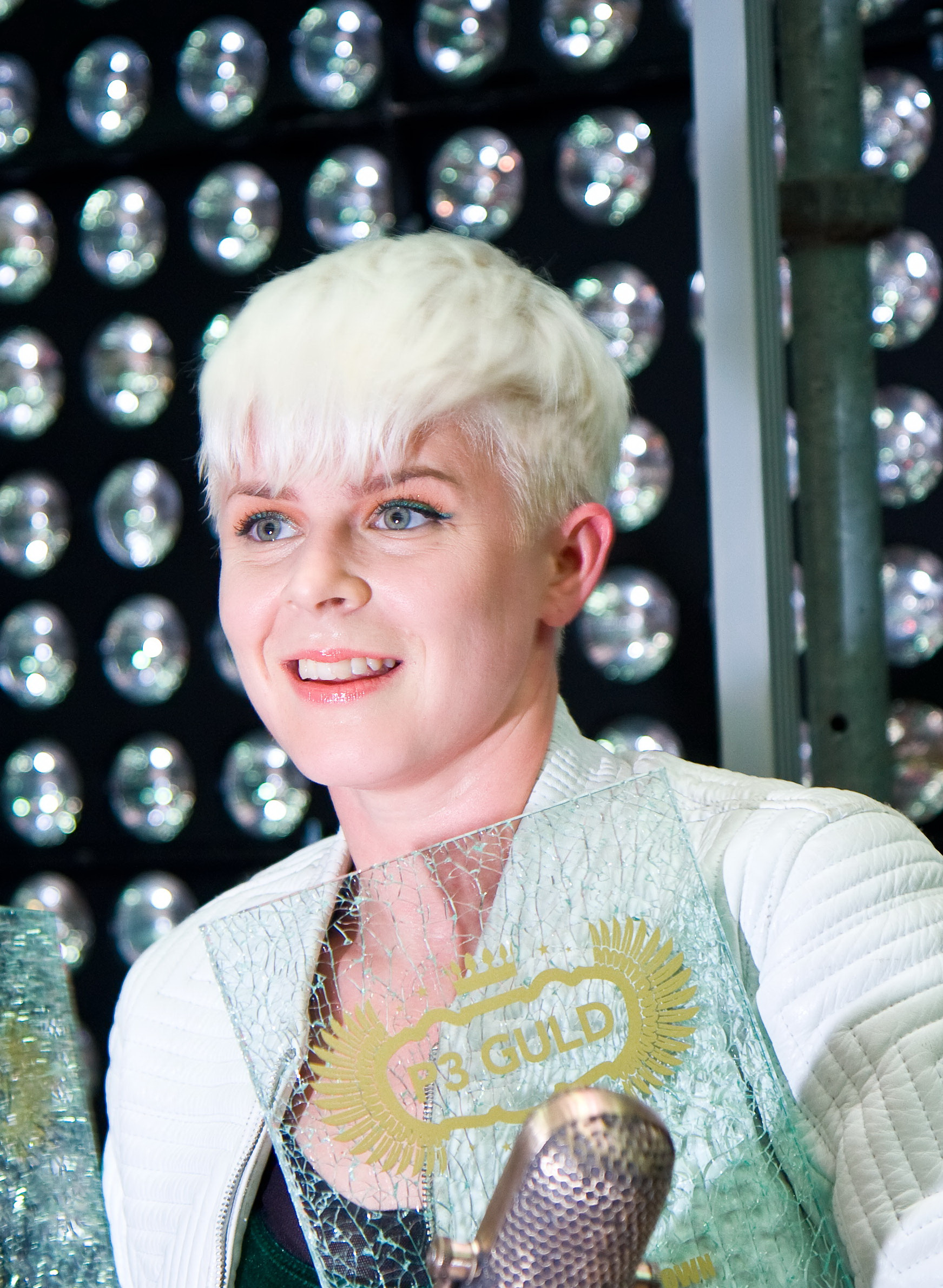
Robyn (pictured in 2011) refused to change lyrics referring to her abortion for the American market, leaving the album unreleased outside Sweden.

BMG initially reported a December 1999 international release, with "Electric" the first European single release in mid-August of that year. In June 1999, RCA Records (Robyn's international label) began formulating the marketing plans for the album in the United States; initial reports anticipated the release of an airplay single in September 1999, followed by the album in January 2000. In December 1999, Aftonbladet reported that Robyn would record new songs for an American version of My Truth or a new album, scheduled for release in the fall of 2000. Due to the lyrics which reflected on her abortion, RCA asked Robyn to re-record portions of the album for the American market and pop radio; according to a June 1999 article in the American music magazine Billboard, the singer had a miscarriage instead of an abortion.

Robyn refused to change the album; negotiations ended after six months, and the plans to release My Truth and its singles abroad were cancelled. Her manager, Alex Strehl, said: "I guess Robyn had moved in a direction that [RCA] didn't expect." Strehl told Aftonbladet that RCA felt that the album lacked potential hit singles. According to Robyn, the label wanted an album like Robyn Is Here and were not invested in My Truth. In 2001, she bought herself out of her contract with RCA for an undisclosed sum and entered a new record deal with Jive Records and Zomba internationally, while remaining with BMG in Sweden. In 2003, she expressed regret over going public with the abortion, saying the reaction was not what she had hoped for. Robyn reflected on the issue for a 2018 story in The New York Times: "You can't really talk about stuff like [abortions] in America, or you couldn't at the time. Not if you were an 18-year-old pop star." My Truth was eventually made available for streaming in the US in December 2014, although the hidden track "Det gör ont ibland" was omitted.

== Singles ==
"Electric" was sent to Swedish radio stations on 22 March 1999 as My Truth's lead single. Robyn first performed the song on the televised Miss Sweden beauty pageant at the Stockholm Concert Hall on 27 March 1999. It was released for purchase on 12 April 1999, with the radio edit and the extended album version. The official music video premiered on 16 May 1999 during the broadcast of the documentary Robyn – ingen vanlig Carlsson on SVT1. "Electric" was Robyn's third top-ten entry on the Sverigetopplistan singles chart, peaking at number six. On 18 May 1999, the single was certified gold by the GLF for sales of 15,000 copies. It was the sixth most-played-song of 1999 on Sveriges Radio P3.

"Play" was selected as the album's second single in June 1999. It was released a month later, on 5 July, with the previously unreleased "Good Thang" as its B-side. BMG intended to commission a music video to promote the single, but Robyn opted to use the video's budget for a nationwide Sweden tour instead. "Play" peaked at number 31 on the Swedish singles chart, becoming Robyn's seventh consecutive top-40 entry on the chart. "Good Thang" was subsequently released as a standalone 12-inch promotional single with club mixes on 20 October 1999.

My Truth's third single, "My Only Reason", was released for purchase on 22 November 1999 with "Det gör ont ibland" on its B-side. The accompanying music video was shot in late-November 1999. The single underperformed on the Swedish singles chart, appearing for one week at number 53. It became Robyn's lowest-charting-song on the chart at the time, and her first single to miss the top 40. "Main Thing", released as the album's fourth and final single on 4 December 2000, did not chart.

== Critical reception ==
Professional ratings
Review scores
Source	Rating
Aftonbladet	4/5 stars
AllMusic	3.5/5 stars
Göteborgs-Posten	4/5 stars

Critical reception of My Truth was generally positive in the Swedish press. According to Aftonbladet, based on reviews by several newspapers when the album was released, it had an average score of 3.4 out of 5. Daniel Lindström of Östersunds-Posten praised it as the best Swedish soul album to date, singling out "Main Thing" as the album's best track. Göteborgs-Posten's Patrik Lindgren praised the album's variety of musical styles, calling Robyn Sweden's top soul singer. Lindgren appreciated the album's not being fitted to the American market, which he found apparent with the lead single ("Electric"). According to Länstidningen Östersund's Björn Bostrand, Robyn separated herself from other up-and-coming singers with My Truth by balancing maturity and youthful ambition. Bostrand praised the singer's vocal performance and the acoustic-pop songs "Not on the Inside" and "Monday Morning". Per Bjurman of Aftonbladet said that although Robyn Is Here's lyrics were charming, My Truth demonstrated the singer's growth and maturity as a songwriter. Bjurman wrote that the album proved that Robyn was a full-fledged musician, and he called it one of the year's best Swedish albums. A Helsingborgs Dagblad reviewer called My Truth one of the year's best Swedish records, praising its music, vocals, and lyrics. Although they felt that some tracks went unnoticed, the album was superior to Robyn Is Here.

The production of My Truth attracted mixed responses from critics. Magnus Persson of Borås Tidning considered the album a step in the right direction and recognized Robyn's songwriting, calling "Universal Woman" one of the album's best moments. Although Persson was less enthusiastic about the Mann-produced tracks, he praised the songs by Lindström & Ekhé and Masters at Work. A Nöjesguiden reviewer highlighted "Main Thing" and "Electric", but criticised what they called the album's cheap production. Karolina Ramqvist of Dagens Nyheter also disliked the "flat" production by Lindström & Ekhé and Mann, but said that Robyn's improvement as a vocalist redeemed the album. Similarly, a Smålandsposten critic wrote positively of tracks produced by Falk and Rusiak, while deeming the album's production "flat" overall. A writer for Dagens industri said that My Truth's mature sound and low-profile approach would alienate her American teen audience. Svenska Dagbladet's Stefan Malmqvist wrote that although it was an impressive record, My Truth was not engaging. Malmqvist praised the more-uptempo tracks, but felt that the album as a whole did not leave a lasting impression. In the same newspaper, Johanna Olofsson saw the album as weak and colorless but better-sounding when performed live.

Since My Truth was not released outside Sweden, it attracted little attention from foreign music critics. John Lucas gave the album a retrospective review for AllMusic, however, writing that "there are no truly weak moments" and calling it "much more organic and mature" than Robyn Is Here. Lucas felt that the album lacked "instant" and "irresistible" hooks, and criticised the "uniformity of sound that can make some songs drift in and out without really making any impression": "Not a commercial blockbuster then, nor a perfect listen, but this album does mark an important step forward for Robyn as an artist." Robert Christgau criticized My Truth in 2011, calling it "as strained as you might fear" and using it as an example of Robyn's "awkward stage that hits teenpop stars like clockwork".

== Accolades and legacy ==
Patrik Lindgren of Göteborgs-Posten called My Truth the fifth-best Swedish album of 1999, regarding it a solid follow-up to Robyn Is Here. Aftonbladet reviewers selected it as the 21st-best album of the year. In 1999, My Truth was nominated for a Rockbjörnen as Swedish Album of the Year. The album earned Robyn her first Grammis at the 2000 awards in the Female Pop/Rock category. The jury called it a "brilliant" follow-up to her debut album, and praised its personal lyrics. The album was also nominated for Album of the Year, and Robyn was nominated for Artist of the Year.

In June 2016, Robyn launched a remix project titled RMX/RBN in which songs spanning her career were remixed by other artists. "Main Thing", remixed by Mr. Tophat and released on 15 July 2016, was the only song included from her back catalogue before the launch of her record label Konichiwa Records in 2004. In 2018, Consequence included the album track "Giving You Back" in the listicle "10 Ways Pop Star Robyn Was Ahead of Her Time", authored by Katie Moulton, using it as an instance of Robyn "open[ing] up about women's health 20 years ago". On the same subject, Sarah Jacoby wrote in Self the same year: "By singing about it in a pop song, Robyn seemingly made a statement that the decision to have an abortion is valid—and so is the spectrum of emotions that goes along with that decision." Also in 2018, Vulture selected "Long Gone" as one of ten songs worth revisiting from the lesser-known parts of Robyn's catalogue. In February 2020, American singer Amanda Palmer played "Giving You Back" while hosting a themed show about abortion, motherhood, and miscarriage on Australian radio station Double J.

== Track listing ==
My Truth — 1999 standard CD edition
No.	Title	Writer(s)	Producer(s)	Length
0.	"Det gör ont ibland" (featuring Petter)	Robyn; Petter; Thomas Rusiak	Rusiak; Robyn^{[a]}; Lindström & Ekhé^{[b]}	4:40
1.	"Play"	Robyn; Ulf Lindström; Johan Ekhé	Lindström & Ekhé	3:58
2.	"My Only Reason"	Robyn; Billy Mann	Mann; K-Fam	4:00
3.	"Underneath the Heart"	Robyn; Mann	Mann	4:22
4.	"Electric"	Robyn; Lindström; Ekhé	Lindström & Ekhé	5:09
5.	"My Truth"	Robyn; Cherno Jah; Ken Fambro	Jah; Lindström & Ekhé^{[c]}; Robyn^{[c]}	3:52
6.	"Main Thing"	Robyn; Louie Vega; Kenny Gonzalez; Roger Williams	Masters at Work	4:42
7.	"Healthy Love" (featuring Cindy)	Robyn; Ekhé; Lindström; Cindy Heinold	Lindström & Ekhé	4:40
8.	"Monday Morning"	Robyn; Mann	Lindström & Ekhé	4:29
9.	"Giving You Back"	Robyn; Donnie Boynton; Fambro	K-Fam	5:01
10.	"88 Days"	Robyn; Mann	Mann; Internal Dread^{[a]}	3:58
11.	"Long Gone"	Robyn; Lindström; Ekhé	Lindström & Ekhé	4:33
12.	"Not on the Inside"	Robyn; Mann	Christian Falk	4:12
13.	"Universal Woman"	Robyn	Falk	5:11
Total length:				62:47

Notes

- The 2014 streaming edition does not include the opening hidden track "Det gör ont ibland".
- ^a signifies a co-producer.
- ^b signifies an additional producer.
- ^c signifies a vocal producer.

== Credits and personnel ==
Credits are adapted from the liner notes of My Truth.

- Robyn – vocals, songwriting (all tracks); backing vocals (tracks 1, 6, 12); co-production (track 0); vocal production (track 5); vocal arrangement (tracks 5, 9)
- Arnthor – additional keyboards, recording (track 0)
- Mats Asplén – keyboards (tracks 12, 13)
- Francisco Ballesteros – hair
- Steve Barkan – mixing (track 6)
- Katreese Barnes – backing vocals (track 6)
- Patric Berger – guitar (track 4
- Britta Bergström – backing vocals (tracks 1, 10)
- Stefan Boman – engineering (track 3)
- Donnie Boynton – piano (tracks 2, 9); songwriting (track 9)
- Eric Broms – photography
- Ralph Cacciurri – assistant engineering (track 9)
- Johan Carlberg – resonator guitar (track 8)
- Mike Ciro – guitar (track 6)
- Pär-Ola Claesson – strings (tracks 0, 1, 8, 11)
- Sara Devine – backing vocals (track 6)
- Dave Darlington – mixing (track 6)
- Hernan "Boogie" Donoso – assistant engineering (tracks 1, 4, 5, 7, 8, 11)
- Robin Dowling – assistant engineering (track 3)
- Per Ekdal – string arrangement (tracks 0, 1, 8, 11)
- Johan Ekhé – backing vocal arrangement, backing vocal recording (track 0); additional keyboards (tracks 0, 9); songwriting (tracks 1, 4, 7, 11); bass guitar (track 2); guitar (track 8)
- Björn Engelmann – mastering (all tracks)
- Almnils Erson – strings (tracks 0, 1, 8, 11)
- Christian Falk – arrangement, bass, production, programming, recording (tracks 12, 13); mixing (track 12)
- Ken "K-Fam" Fambro – arrangement, production, recording (tracks 2, 9); programming (track 2); songwriting (tracks 5, 9)
- Leila Forstén – strings (tracks 0, 11)
- Niklas Gabrielsson – handclaps (track 1); drums (track 8); tambourine (track 11)
- Kenny "Dope" Gonzalez – songwriting (track 6)
- Lars Halapi – guitar (track 13)
- Martin Hansen – engineering (tracks 2, 3)
- Cindy Heinold – songwriting, vocals (track 7)
- Kenny Hickson – vocal arrangement (track 9)
- Angela Holland – backing vocals (track 1)
- Internal Dread – co-production, electric guitar, engineering (track 10)
- Cherno Jah – arrangement, instruments, mixing, production, recording (track 5)
- Janson & Janson – string arrangement (tracks 3, 10, 12, 13)
- Henrik Janson – strings (track 12)
- Henrik Jonsson – mastering (all tracks)
- Ronny Lahti – mixing (tracks 12, 13)
- Lindström & Ekhé – additional production (track 0); arrangement, instruments, production, recording (tracks 1, 4, 7, 8, 11); mixing (tracks 1, 2, 4, 5, 7, 8, 9, 10, 11); vocal arrangement, vocal production (track 5)
- Ulf Lindström – bass (track 0); guitar (tracks 0, 4, 8); songwriting (tracks 1, 4, 7, 11)
- Gustav Ljunggren – horns, pedal steel guitar (track 11)
- Bernard Löhr – mixing (track 3)
- Billy Mann – arrangement, production (tracks 2, 3, 8, 10); songwriting (tracks 2, 3, 8, 10, 11); electric guitar, recording (track 2); acoustic guitar, backing vocals (tracks 2, 10, 12); bass (tracks 2, 3, 10); guitar (tracks 3, 8, 12); organ (track 10); vocal arrangement (track 12)
- Gunilla Markström – strings (tracks 0, 1, 8)
- Olle Markström – strings (tracks 1, 8)
- Masters at Work – production (track 6)
- Pirjo Neimelä – styling
- Gene Perez – bass (track 6)
- Petter – songwriting, vocals (track 0)
- Paul Pimsler – guitar (track 3); electric guitar (track 10)
- James Poyser – keyboards (track 6)
- Luisito Quintero – congas, percussion (track 6)
- Oscar Ramirez – assistant engineering (track 6)
- Antonella Reyner – makeup
- Rock-Owe – bass, piano (track 10)
- Thomas Rusiak – production, programming, songwriting, string arrangement (track 0)
- Stylee Scott – drums (track 10)
- S.N.Y.K.O. – strings (tracks 3, 10, 12, 13)
- Stephen Simmonds – backing vocals (track 3)
- Brian Smith – engineering (track 9)
- Alex Strehl – A&R, concept, executive production, design
- Peter Swartling – A&R, executive production; heartbeat effect (track 3)
- Pål Svenre – additional keyboards (track 5); keyboards (tracks 12, 13)
- Esbjörn Svensson – piano (track 3)
- Titiyo – backing vocals (track 10)
- Little Louie Vega – songwriting (track 6)
- Sebastian Wahl – artwork, concept, design
- Roger Williams – songwriting (track 6)

== Charts ==
Chart (1999)	Peak position
Swedish Albums (Sverigetopplistan)	2

== Certifications ==
Region	Certification	Certified units/sales
Sweden (GLF)	Platinum	130,000

== Release history ==
Country	Date	Format	Label	Ref.
Sweden	17 May 1999	CD	BMG Sweden	
Various	16 December 2014	Streaming	RCA	
