= Blekinge Läns Tidning =

Swedish local newspaper

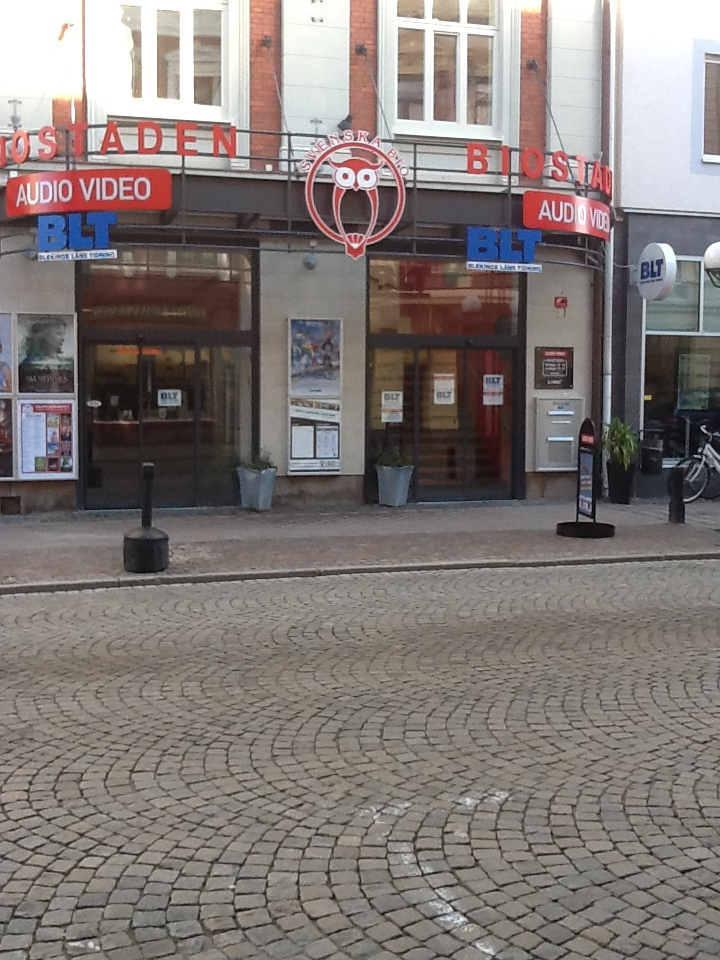
- BLT's office
- Type: Local newspaper
- Founders: Frans August Blomquist; Palle Nilsson
- Publisher: AB Blekinge Läns Tidning
- Founded: 1869; 157 years ago
- Political alignment: Liberal
- Language: Swedish
- Country: Sweden
- Website: https://www.blt.se/

Blekinge Läns Tidning, known as BLT, is a local newspaper in Karlskrona, Sweden, which has been in circulation since 1869.

== History and profile ==
Blekinge Läns Tidning was established by Frans August Blomquist and Palle Nilsson in Karlskrona in 1869, and its first issue appeared in December that year. The paper was published twice a week by Bolagstryckeriet, a company owned by Blomquist and Nilsson, who sold Blekinge Läns Tidning in 1873. It was published under different title until 1878 when Göte Bjurman acquired the paper. Then its original title, Blekinge Läns Tidning, began to be used, and it was published by Länsboktryckeriet. Bjurman edited and published the paper until 1904 and N. S. Lundström succeeded him in both posts.

Its owners changed again twice until 1911. Its publishing company, AB Blekinge Läns Tidning, was founded the same year. The frequency of the paper increased to six per week in the 1920s.

Blekinge Läns Tidning was a social democratic publication in the early period. However, later it adopted a liberal political stance. It is one of the Swedish media outlets which publish interviews with far-right political figures one of which was with Richard Jomshof in August 2021.

Tidningen Barometerns AB bought the stock majority in Blekinge Läns Tidning in 1975. During this period the paper was the best-selling newspaper with a circulation of 30,000 copies. Another local newspaper based in Karlskrona, Karlshamns Allehanda, was acquired by Blekinge Läns Tidning in 1976. Blekinge Läns Tidning merged with Barometern and Smålandsposten, to create the Sydostpress Newspaper Group in 1990. It created the joint holding company Gota Media with three newspapers, namely Barometern, Borås Tidning and Smålandsposten in 2003.

Blekinge Läns Tidning sold 34,500 copies in 2010.
