= Play (Robyn song) =

Single by Robyn

from the album My Truth
- B-side: "Good Thang"
- Released: 5 July 1999
- Studio: Lifeline Studios (Stockholm)
- Length: 3:58
- Label: BMG Sweden
- Songwriters: Robyn; Ulf Lindström; Johan Ekhé
- Producers: Lindström & Ekhé

Robyn singles chronology
"Electric" (1999)	"Play" (1999)	"My Only Reason" (1999)

"Play" is a song recorded by Swedish recording artist Robyn from her second studio album, My Truth (1999). She wrote the track in collaboration with Ulf Lindström and Johan Ekhé, who also handled its production. BMG Sweden released it as the album's second single on 5 July 1999, featuring the non-album song "Good Thang" as its B-side. Musically, "Play" contains some world music influences in its sound and a "playful" vibe.

"Play" received positive critical response from music critics, and became Robyn's seventh consecutive top 40 entry on the Sverigetopplistan chart, where it peaked at number 31. The singer performed the song live while promoting its parent album, but the single itself received limited promotion. As in the case with My Truth, "Play" was not serviced outside of Sweden due to a dispute between Robyn and her international label, RCA Records.

== Background and composition ==
"Play" was written by Robyn, Ulf Lindström and Johan Ekhé. Lindström and Ekhé recorded Robyn's vocals and produced the track at Lifeline Studios in Stockholm, Sweden. Almnils Erson, Pär-Ola Claesson, Gunilla Markström and Olle Markström played the strings, and Niklas Gabrielsson provided handclaps, while Lindström and Ekhé played all other instruments and managed arrangement and mixing. Britta Bergström and Angela Holland sang backing vocals alongside Robyn. Björn Engelmann and Henrik Jonsson were enlisted to master the track at Cutting Room Studios in Stockholm.

Musically, "Play" is slightly world music-tinged, according to music critic Per Bjurman of Swedish tabloid Aftonbladet. AllMusic's John Lucas felt it incorporated a playful vibe, deeming it "as playful a song as [Robyn]'s ever recorded". The recording's refrain contains the line, "Your heart will never grow bitter if you remember how to play".

== Release and promotion ==
In the 19 June 1999 issue of Billboard magazine, it was announced that "Play" would be serviced as the second single from Robyn's second studio album, My Truth (1999), following the lead single "Electric" (1999). Subsequently, "Play" was made available for purchase as a CD single in Sweden on 5 July 1999 through BMG Sweden with "Good Thang" as its B-side. Eric Broms photographed the single cover art, which features Robyn wearing a feather headpiece designed by Sebastian Wahl. The maxi single additionally contains "club vocal" and "club instrumental" versions of "Good Thang"; the B-side later received a standalone limited 12" vinyl release on 20 October 1999. The track was written by Robyn, Anders Bagge and Harry Sommerdahl, while Little Louie Vega and Kenny "Dope" Gonzalez of Masters at Work produced it.

"Play" and its parent album were not distributed outside of Sweden due to a dispute between Robyn and RCA Records; the label wanted the singer to re-record portions of the album as certain aspects reflected on her abortion, a topic deemed unsuitable for the American market and pop radio. As Robyn refused to alter the record, RCA cancelled the plans to release My Truth and its singles abroad. To promote the project in Sweden, Robyn hosted a live concert at My Truth's release party on 21 May 1999, in the department store NK in Stockholm, where she performed "Play" among other material from the album. She also included the song in the set list of a 1999 summer tour hosted by MTV in the Nordic countries. Despite being released commercially, the promotion for "Play" did not include an accompanying music video, unlike "Electric" and the following single, "My Only Reason" (1999). BMG wanted to commission a music video to promote the single, but Robyn chose to use the video's budget for the tour.

== Reception ==
"Play" was acclaimed by Swedish music critics. Aftonbladet's Fredrik Virtanen felt it ought to be an international hit due to its catchiness. Similarly, Mattias Dahlström of Swedish newspaper Dagens Nyheter deemed the single an "obvious" success. The single fared moderately in Sweden; it debuted at number 53 on the Sverigetopplistan chart on 22 July 1999. The next week, it ascended to number 34 before reaching its peak position at number 31 in its third week. The single became Robyn's seventh consecutive top 40 entry on the chart, but failed to match the success of My Truth's lead single "Electric", which peaked at number 6. "Play" remained on the chart for seven weeks before falling off.

== Track listings ==
- CD single
1. "Play" – 3:58
2. "Good Thang" – 7:07
- Maxi single'
1. "Play" – 3:58
2. "Good Thang" – 7:07
3. "Good Thang" (club vocal) – 7:07
4. "Good Thang" (club instrumental) – 7:07

== Credits and personnel ==
Credits adapted from the liner notes of the single's CD release.

Recording

- Produced, arranged, recorded and mixed at Lifeline Studios (Stockholm, Sweden)
- Mastered at Cutting Room Studios (Stockholm, Sweden)

Personnel

- Robyn – background vocals, songwriting
- Ulf Lindström – arrangement, instruments, mixing, production, recording
- Johan Ekhé – arrangement, instruments, mixing, production, recording
- Per Ekdal – string arrangement
- Almnils Erson – strings
- Pär-Ola Claesson – strings
- Gunilla Markström – strings
- Olle Markström – strings
- Niklas Gabrielsson – handclaps
- Hernan "Boogie" Donoso – assistant engineering
- Björn Engelmann – mastering
- Henrik Jonsson – mastering

== Charts ==
Weekly chart performance for "Play"
Chart (1999)	Peak position
Sweden (Sverigetopplistan)	31

== Release history ==
"Play" release history
Country	Date	Format	Label	Ref.
Sweden	5 July 1999	CD single; maxi single	BMG Sweden	
