= Stop the Music =

Stop the Music may refer to:

== Radio and television ==
- Stop the Music (American game show), 1948 radio quiz show and later TV series
- Stop the Music (Australian TV series), a 1956 Australian music-based game show TV series

== Music ==
- Stop the Music (album), a 2002 album by New Breed, or the title song

=== Songs ===
- "Stop the Music", a 1948 song written by Babe Russin and Jack Hoffman
- "Stop the Music", a 1962 song and single by The Shirelles, Denson
- "Stop the Music", a 1964 song by The Chartbusters, B-side of "Why (Doncha Be My Girl)"
- "Stop the Music", a 1965 song and single by The Hitmakers
- "Stop the Music", a 1966 song by Elkie Brooks, B-side of "Baby Let Me Love You"
- "Stop the Music" (P-Money song), a 2004 song by P-Money
- "Stop the Music", a 2010 song and single by The Pipettes from Earth vs. The Pipettes

== Other uses ==
- Stop the Music (horse), an American racehorse

== See also ==
- Don't Stop the Music (disambiguation)
