= Barometern =

Swedish local newspaper

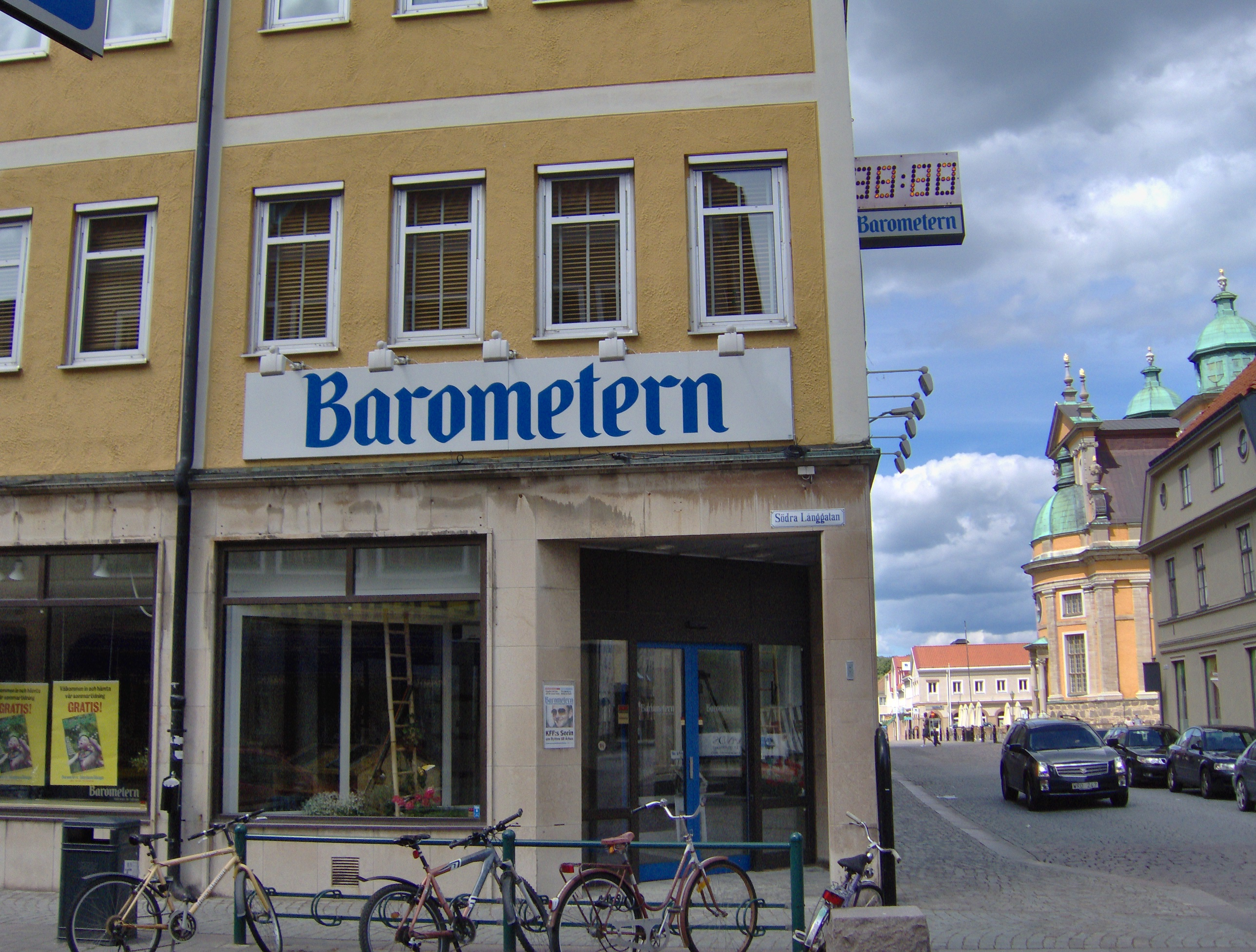
- Barometern offices in Kalmar
- Format: Tabloid
- Owner(s): Gota Media
- Founded: 1841; 184 years ago
- Language: Swedish
- Headquarters: Kalmar
- Country: Sweden
- Website: Barometern OT

Barometern OT is a local newspaper published in Kalmar, Sweden. It is the leading paper in its circulation area.

== History and profile ==
Barometern was established in 1841. The paper was published by the Tidningen Barometerns AB from 1903 to 1989. Then it was published by a stock corporation, Barometern-OT AB, between 1990 and 2002. In 2003 the paper merged with three newspapers, namely Blekinge Läns Tidning, Borås Tidning and Smålandsposten, to create the joint holding company Gota Media. The company is the owner of Barometern OT which is based in Kalmar. Since 1963 another local paper, Oskarshamns-Tidningen, has been published as an edition of the paper.

Barometern OT has been published in tabloid format since 24 April 2001. Toge Forsberg served as the editor-in-chief of the paper which is published six times per week.

== Circulation ==
In 2010 Barometern OT sold 42,300 copies. The circulation of the paper was 41,000 copies in 2012 and 40,300 copies in 2013.
