= You've Got That Somethin' =

Single by Robyn

from the album Robyn Is Here
- B-side: "I Wish"
- Released: 20 May 1995 (Sweden)
- Recorded: 1995
- Genre: Pop; R&B
- Length: 3:44
- Label: Riochet; BMG
- Songwriters: Robyn; Ulf Lindström; Johan Ekhé
- Producers: Ulf Lindström; Johan Ekhé

Robyn singles chronology
"You've Got That Somethin'" (1995)	"Do You Really Want Me (Show Respect)" (1995)

Robyn UK singles chronology
"You've Got That Somethin'" (1996)	"Do You Know (What It Takes)" (1996)

Music video
- "You've Got That Somethin'" on YouTube

"You've Got That Somethin'" is a song by Swedish recording artist Robyn from her debut album, Robyn Is Here (1995). It was released as her debut single in Sweden in 1995 by Riochet and BMG. The song was written by Robyn, Ulf Lindström, and Johan Ekhé, and it was produced by Lindström and Ekhé. In her native Sweden, "You've Got That Somethin'" was a top thirty hit, peaking at number twenty-four. The single was a minor hit in the United Kingdom, peaking at number fifty-four. It also charted at number eighty-five in Germany.

== Critical reception ==
Pan-European magazine Music & Media wrote, "White label copies of the debut single 'You Got That Somethin'' have been mailed out to clubs in the UK and France by RCA and NNB/BMG respectively. Who would believe that it's a blonde Swede singing such TLC-esque material?" People Magazine said, "Not only has Robyn mastered the English language (she writes all her own material), but she also challenges teen queens Brandy and Monica at their own hip-hop soul game. Just listen to the assured manner with which her voice glides over the swaggering, syncopated funk of 'In My Heart' and 'You've Got That Somethin''."

== Track listing ==
- CD maxi-single, UK
1. "You've Got That Somethin'" (radio edit)
2. "You've Got That Somethin'" (Scruffy Mix)
3. "You've Got That Somethin'" (Marco's Hard Mix)
4. "You've Got That Somethin'" (2000 Black Mix)
5. "You've Got That Somethin'" (Golden Youngster Remix) (featuring Structure Rize)
6. "You've Got That Somethin'" (Golden Youngster Straight Ta Ya Head Mix) (featuring Structure Rize)
- CD maxi-single, Germany
1. "You've Got That Somethin'" (radio edit)
2. "You've Got That Somethin'" (Marco's hard mix)
3. "You've Got That Somethin'" (2000 Black mix)
4. "I Wish" (a cappella)
- 12" single, Sweden

Side A

1. "You've Got That Somethin'" (Marco's Hard Mix)

Side B

1. "You've Got That Somethin'" (Scruffy Mix)
2. "You've Got That Somethin'" (2000 Black Mix)

== Personnel ==
- Lyrics – Robyn
- Music and vocal arrangement – Robyn, Ulf Lindström, Johan Ekhé
- Arrangement and production – Ulf Lindström, Johan Ekhé

== Charts ==
Chart (1995–96)	Peak position
Estonia (Eesti Top 20)	15
Europe (European Dance Radio)	19
Germany (GfK)	85
Sweden (Sverigetopplistan)	24
UK Singles (OCC)	54
UK Dance (OCC)	27
UK R&B (OCC)	5

== Release history ==
Region	Date	Format(s)	Label(s)	Ref(s).
Sweden	20 May 1995	CD	Ariola; Ricochet; BMG	
United Kingdom	15 July 1996	CD; cassette	RCA; BMG	
