= Don't Stop the Music (Robyn album) =

2002 studio album by Robyn

Studio album by Robyn
- Released: 30 October 2002
- Length: 48:02
- Labels: BMG; Jive
- Producers: Ghost; Guy Sigsworth; Max Martin; Alexander Kronlund; Cherno Jah; Cutfather & Joe

Robyn chronology
My Truth (1999)	Don't Stop the Music (2002)	Robyn's Best (2004)

Singles from Don't Stop the Music
- 1. "Keep This Fire Burning" Released: 16 September 2002; 2. "Don't Stop the Music" Released: 20 January 2003

Professional ratings
Review scores
Source	Rating
Aftonbladet	3/5 stars
AllMusic	4/5 stars
Gaffa	3/6 stars

Don't Stop the Music is the third studio album by Swedish pop singer Robyn. It was released on 30 October 2002 in Sweden by BMG. The album peaked at number two in her native Sweden, and the two singles "Keep This Fire Burning" and "Don't Stop the Music" were both top 10 hits. In 2003, Don't Stop the Music was certified platinum by IFPI, and has sold over 60,000 copies in Sweden.

The song "Should Have Known" also appears on Robyn's self-titled fourth studio album from 2005 in a re-recorded version. Despite the album's two singles being released through most of Europe, the album was only available in Sweden until 2019, when it received a worldwide digital release on Konichiwa Records.

The track "Blow My Mind" was re-recorded and included on Robyn's ninth studio album Sexistential released on March, 27 of 2026

== Track listing ==
No.	Title	Writer(s)	Producer(s)	Length
1.	"Keep This Fire Burning"	Robyn; Remee; Ulf Lindström; Johan Ekhé	Ghost	3:50
2.	"Don't Stop the Music"	Robyn; Remee; Alexander Kronlund; Lindström; Ekhé	Ghost	3:27
3.	"O Baby"	Robyn; Kronlund	Ghost; Max Martin^{[a]}; Kronlund^{[a]}	4:06
4.	"Blow My Mind"	Robyn; Kronlund	Guy Sigsworth	4:06
5.	"Should Have Known"	Robyn; Kronlund	Sigsworth	4:39
6.	"Moonlight"	Robyn; Teron Beal; Lindström; Ekhé	Ghost	3:48
7.	"Breakdown Intermission"	Robyn; Thomas Dolby; Stephen Volk; Cherno Jah; Ekhé; Lindström	Ghost; Jah	3:26
8.	"Ain't No Thing"	Robyn; Lindström; Ekhé	Ghost	3:30
9.	"Big City"	Robyn; Remee; Lindström; Ekhé	Ghost	4:01
10.	"Psycho"	Robyn; Remee; Lindström; Ekhé	Ghost	4:15
11.	"Still Your Girl"	Robyn; Remee; Cutfather & Joe	Ghost; Cutfather & Joe^{[b]}	3:54
12.	"Regntunga skyar" (hidden track)	Thore Ehrling; Eskil Eckert-Lundin; Hasse Ekman		5:00
Total length:				48:02

- ^{^[a]} signifies an additional producer
- ^{^[b]} signifies a vocal producer

== Charts and certifications ==
=== Weekly charts ===
Chart (2002)	Peak position
Swedish Albums (Sverigetopplistan)	2

=== Year-end charts ===
Chart (2002)	Position
Swedish Albums (Sverigetopplistan)	27
Chart (2003)	Position
Swedish Albums (Sverigetopplistan)	20

=== Certifications ===
Country	Certifications (sales thresholds)
Sweden	Platinum

== Release history ==
Region	Date	Format	Label	Ref.
Sweden	30 October 2002	CD	BMG · RCA · Sapphire	
Worldwide	9 July 2019	Digital download · streaming	Konichiwa	
