= Resumé (magazine) =

Swedish language fortnightly news magazine

- Categories: News magazine Trade magazine
- Frequency: Fortnightly
- Publisher: Resumé Förlag AB
- Founded: 1950; 75 years ago
- Company: Bonnier Tidskrifter
- Country: Sweden
- Based in: Stockholm
- Language: Swedish
- Website: http://www.resume.se/
- ISSN: 0036-1887
- OCLC: 938293134

Resumé is a Swedish language fortnightly news magazine published in Stockholm, Sweden. The magazine features articles about mass media and marketing communications.

== History and profile ==
Resumé was founded in 1950. The magazine is part of Bonnier Tidskrifter and is published by Resumé Förlag AB on a fortnightly basis in Stockholm. It includes news about mass media and marketing communications. It claims to be Scandinavia's biggest magazine dealing with advertising, media and marketing.

As of 2020 the editor-in-chief of Resumé was Fredrik Svedjetun. Since 1996 the magazine has given an award for the "Lobbyist of This Year" (Årets lobbyist).

== Controversy ==
In April 2019, Resumé was accused of racism after publishing an article about the actor Suheib Saleh's participation in a commercial for the company Kry. Summary questioned Krys' choice of Saleh as the actor also played drug lords in the TV series Greatest of All. The criticism of Resumé was that Resumé did not distinguish between the actor and a fictional character and that similar questions are not made when other famous actors appear in advertising contexts, when they also had roles as criminal characters in film or TV productions.
