= Donnie Boynton =

American songwriter and musician (born 1976)

Donyell Boynton
- Also known as: D Major, Don Boynton
- Born: 1976 (age 49–50); Detroit, Michigan, United States
- Genres: R&B; soul; jazz; gospel; hip-hop
- Occupations: Songwriter; producer; multi-instrumentalist; music director
- Label: Groove Centric Music / The Donn Group

Donnie "D Major" Boynton (born 1976), is an American songwriter, producer, multi-instrumentalist and music director, best known for his production contributions to Gerald Levert, Boyz II Men, Destiny's Child and Robyn albums, as well as assisting the musical direction of Tyler Perry's 2004 touring production Meet the Browns. Beginning his career as a keyboardist on UPN's 1997 late-night show Vibe, Boynton became a touring bandmember, accompanying gospel and hip-hop acts in concert such as Lil' Kim, Mase, Vanessa Bell Armstrong and Tye Tribbett, among others. He is currently the keyboardist of touring R&B/jazz band Groove Centric.

== Songwriting, instrumental, engineering and production credits ==
Credits are courtesy of Discogs, Tidal, Apple Music, and AllMusic.

Title	Year	Artist	Album
"I'll Be There"	1996	Tim Bowman	Love, Joy, Peace
"Say It Again"	1996	Nneka	Eddie (soundtrack)
"Don't Take Your Love Away"	1997	Mario Winans	Story of My Heart
"My Only Reason"	1999	Robyn	My Truth
"Giving You Back"	1999	Robyn	My Truth
"Now That She's Gone"	1999	Destiny's Child	The Writing's on the Wall
"Ya Di Ya" (Featuring Missy Elliott)	1999	Gina Thompson	If You Only Knew (Shelved)
"Once My Shhh"	2000	Sam Salter	The Little Black Book (Shelved)
"Let Me Know"	2000	Gerald Levert	G
"What Would You Do?"	2001	Nine20	Non-album single
"Maybe"	2001	Raphael Brown	Private Life (Shelved)
"Whatcha Need"	2002	Boyz II Men	Full Circle
"Keep On Dreaming"	2008	Lyfe Jennings	Lyfe Change
"I Need You"	2014	Lowell Pye	Transformed
"Drowning (Swimming With Sharks)"	2015	Ray BLK	Havisham
"Kurr£ncy"	2018	IAMDDB	Flightmode, Vol. 4
"Azul"	2018	IAMDDB	Flightmode, Vol. 4
"That Chicken"	2018	Dyme-A-Duzin	Crown Fried

== Selected stage credits & appearances ==
Year	Title	Role	Notes
1997–1998	Vibe	Keyboardist	Originally hosted by comedian Chris Spencer and subsequently Sinbad.
2004–2005	Meet the Browns	Keyboardist / Musical Arrangement Assistance	A Tyler Perry production.
2018	Redemption of a Dogg	Musical Director	Biographical Music Production Presented by Snoop Dogg
