= Ken Fambro =

American songwriter, producer, multi-instrumentalist

Rickie Kenneth Fambro
- Also known as: K-Fam; TheBeatFreqz
- Born: East Point, Georgia / Atlanta, Georgia, United States
- Genres: R&B; soul; hip-hop
- Occupations: Songwriter; producer
- Label: Hitco Music Publishing

Kenneth "K-Fam" Fambro is an American songwriter, producer, and multi-instrumentalist best known for producing and co-writing for Boyz II Men, Destiny's Child, and Robyn, among others. Fambro, a pianist and drummer by ear, was an early protégé of Antonio "L.A." Reid, who brought him to LaFace Records / Arista Records where he worked alongside production outfit Organized Noize. This opportunity resulted in placements on Boyz II Men's Full Circle, Sam Salter single "Once My Sh..", "Now That She's Gone" from Destiny's Child album The Writing's on the Wall, and single "Ya Di Ya" from Gina Thompson and rapper Missy Elliott, as well as contributions on various 112 projects. Fambro recently contributed to country/trap artist Blanco Brown's 2019 debut album Honeysuckle & Lightning Bugs.

== Songwriting, instrumental and production credits ==
Credits are courtesy of Discogs, Tidal, Apple Music, and AllMusic.

Title	Year	Artist	Album
"Atlanta Madness" (Featuring Total Control)	1992	A+ Plus	I Bet U Could
"Zoom"	1992	A+ Plus	I Bet U Could
"Hokie Pokie"	1992	A+ Plus	I Bet U Could
"I Bet U Could"	1992	A+ Plus	I Bet U Could
"I Don't Wanna Use Your Love"	1992	A+ Plus	I Bet U Could
"Love Is Difficult"	1992	A+ Plus	I Bet U Could
"Would U Lie To Me"	1994	On Edge	On Edge
"Black Berry Juice (Interlude)"	1994	On Edge	On Edge
"Black Berry Juice (Outerlude)"	1994	On Edge	On Edge
"Old School Flava"	1994	Treacherous Three	Old School Flava
"Lower the Boom"	1994	Treacherous Three	Old School Flava
"Mo' Money Mo"	1994	Treacherous Three	Old School Flava
"We Wit It" (Featuring Big Daddy Kane, Chuck D, Heavy D, Melle Mel, Tito)	1994	Treacherous Three	Old School Flava
"A True Story"	1994	Treacherous Three	Old School Flava
"Let a Playa Get His Freak On" (Featuring Jazze Pha)	1997	LSG	Levert.Sweat.Gill
"The Comeback" (Featuring Tha Dogg Pound)	1998	TQ	They Never Saw Me Coming
"What's Up" (Featuring Left Eye)	1998	De De O'Neal	Non-album single
"Now That She's Gone"	1999	Destiny's Child	The Writing's on the Wall
"Came in the Door Pimpin'" (Featuring Too Short)	1999	Dave Hollister	Ghetto Hymns
"I Think About It"	1999	Men of Vizion	MOV
"Real Love"	1999	Men of Vizion	MOV
"The Rain"	1999	Men of Vizion	MOV
"My Only Reason"	1999	Robyn	My Truth
"My Truth"	1999	Robyn	My Truth
"Giving You Back"	1999	Robyn	My Truth
"Ya Di Ya" (Featuring Missy Elliott)	1999	Gina Thompson	If You Only Knew (Shelved)
"You Bring Out the Freak"	2000	Profyle	Nothin' but Drama
"Die Famous"	2000	Lil Zane	Young World: The Future
"Once My Sh.."	2000	Sam Salter	Little Black Book (Shelved)
"Let Me Know"	2000	Gerald Levert	G (International Editions)
"The Story of Beauty"	2001	Destiny's Child	Survivor
"I Gotta Leave You / I'm Leaving" (Unreleased)	2001	Destiny's Child	Survivor
"I Appreciate You"	2001	Pam & Dodi	Pam & Dodi
"I'm Leaving" (With Trina Powell)	2001	Jesse Powell	JP
"Maybe"	2001	Raphael Brown	Private Life (Shelved)
"Ain't a Thang Wrong" (Featuring Rob Jackson)	2002	Boyz II Men	Full Circle
"Whatcha Need"	2002	Boyz II Men	Full Circle
"I'm OK, You're OK"	2002	Boyz II Men	Full Circle
"On the Road Again"	2002	Boyz II Men	Full Circle
"Makin' Love (Interlude)"	2002	Boyz II Men	Full Circle
"Twisted"	2002	Luis Fonsi	Fight the Feeling
"Make It Last Forever"	2003	Kenny Lattimore & Chanté Moore	Things That Lovers Do
"Still In Love"	2004	Gordon Chambers	Introducing...
"Why Can't We Get Along"	2005	112	Pleasure & Pain
"What Is This?"	2005	Scar & CeeLo Green	Got Purp? Vol. 2
"Love Sick"	2008	Cherish	The Truth
"Get It Girl" (Unreleased)	2010	Ciara	Basic Instinct
"Bang" (Featuring 2 Chainz & Salo)	2011	Lloyd	King of Hearts
"Break Up Season"	2011	Keke Palmer	Undefeated (Shelved)
"You Deserve"	2014	August Alsina	Testimony
"True Colors"	2017	112	Q, Mike, Slim, Daron
"Thank You Interlude"	2017	112	Q, Mike, Slim, Daron
"IMMABEHOME"	2017	Adrian Marcel	#GMFU – Got Me F%^&ed Up
"HeadNod"	2019	Blanco Brown	Honeysuckle & Lightning Bugs

== Guest appearances ==
List of guest appearances, with other performing artists, showing year released and album name
Title	Year	Other performer(s)	Album
"To Da River"	2003	T-Bone, Lil Zane, Montell Jordan	The Fighting Temptations (Soundtrack)

== Awards and nominations ==
Year	Ceremony	Award	Result	Ref
2000	Swedish Grammis Awards	Best Album (My Truth)	Nominated	
