= Västerviks-Tidningen =

Swedish newspaper

- Type: Daily newspaper
- Format: Tabloid
- Owner: Norrköping Tidningar Media AB
- Publisher: Pressgrannar AB
- Editor-in-chief: Charli Nilsson
- Language: Swedish
- Circulation: 12,000 (2010)
- Sister newspapers: Norrköpings Tidningar
- ISSN: 1104-0289
- OCLC number: 37502082
- Website: Västerviks-Tidningen

Västerviks-Tidningen is a Swedish daily newspaper based in Västervik.

== History and profile ==
Västerviks-Tidningen was established in 1834. Its chief editor is Charly Nilsson. The paper is a part of the Norrköping Tidningar Media AB which also owns Norrköpings Tidningar. The publisher of Västerviks-Tidningen has been Pressgrannar AB since January 2012.

Västerviks-Tidningen has its headquarters in Västervik.
