= Robyn Is Here =

- original Swedish and Japanese cover

Studio album by Robyn
- Released: 13 October 1995
- Studios: BAG Studios; Cheiron Studios; Polar Studios; Radio Nova; Softsound Studios; Soundtrade Studios
- Genres: Pop; dance-pop; R&B
- Length: 55:43
- Labels: Ricochet; Ariola; BMG
- Producers: Anders Bagge; Christian Falk; Ghost; Max Martin; Denniz Pop; Harry Sommerdahl

Robyn chronology
Robyn Is Here (1995)	My Truth (1999)

Singles from Robyn Is Here
- 1. "You've Got That Somethin'" Released: 1995; 2. "Do You Really Want Me (Show Respect)" Released: 11 September 1995; 3. "Do You Know (What It Takes)" Released: 22 January 1996; 4. "Show Me Love" Released: 24 February 1997

Alternative cover
- North American variant of international cover. On other pressings, the cover has a red, beige or green tint and/or different colored text.

Robyn Is Here is the debut studio album by Swedish singer Robyn. It was originally released on 13 October 1995 in Sweden by Ricochet Records, Ariola Records and BMG. The original edition of the album only received a release in Sweden, Japan and certain Asian and Latin American territories. However, a revised edition received an international release throughout 1997 and 1998. The album peaked at number eight on the Swedish chart and was certified double platinum by the Swedish Recording Industry Association (GLF). In the United States, the album was certified platinum by the Recording Industry Association of America (RIAA), and had sold more than 922,000 copies by June 2010, according to Nielsen SoundScan. Worldwide, the album has sold over 1.5 million copies.

The album is mainly written and produced by Swedish production team Ghost, with all songs co-written by Robyn. Denniz Pop and Max Martin produced two of the album's four singles, "Do You Know (What It Takes)" and "Show Me Love". Both peaked at number seven in the US, while the latter peaked at number eight in the UK.

On 1 June 2004 BMG released Robyn's Best. While titled like a greatest hits album, it is a repackaging of the US edition of Robyn Is Here.

== Critical reception ==
Professional ratings
Review scores
Source	Rating
AllMusic	4/5 stars
MSN Music (Expert Witness)	B+
Music Week	4/5 stars

Writing for Melody Maker in February 1998, Peter Robinson described Robyn Is Here as an "impressive album" and highlighted it as an alternative to other contemporaneous pop acts; "While the music loses its edge stretched over 13 tracks, and at the same time surrenders its subtlety when heard on a song-by-song basis, Robyn Is Here is nonetheless a slinky, funky album, and for all those disappointed by the weediness of Louise, disillusioned by the Spice Girls, or distracted by the hastily drafted in Kim Wilde lookalike factor of All Saints, Robyn's your gal." In his consumer guide for MSN Music, critic Robert Christgau gave the album a B+ rating, indicating "remarkable one way or another, yet also flirts with the humdrum or the half-assed". Christgau described it as "So front-loaded it could almost be a vinyl album with a hot side and a cool side", but commented that "a few spins in, you notice a hint of velvet in her timbre—more like suede, really—that suggests not sensuality but emotional depth".

== Robyn's Best ==
In 2004 a decade long partnership between Robyn and BMG ended. After hearing "Who's That Girl", BMG reacted negatively, encouraging Robyn to start her own label, founding Konichiwa Records one year later. Robyn's Best was released on 1 June 2004. While its title implies a greatest hits album, it is a repackaging of the US edition of Robyn Is Here with a revised running order and three tracks removed.

K. Ross Hoffman of AllMusic gave the album two out of five stars and calls it "a shamelessly misleading and essentially worthless release that seems misguided even as a straight-up cash-grab attempt".

== Track listing ==
All lyrics are written by Robyn; "Do You Know (What It Takes)" co-written by Herbie Crichlow and "Show Me Love" co-written by Max Martin.

Robyn Is Here – Original Swedish release
No.	Title	Music	Length
1.	"Bumpy Ride"	Robyn; Ulf Lindström; Johan Ekhé	4:09
2.	"In My Heart"	Robyn; Lindström; Ekhé	3:59
3.	"You've Got That Somethin'"	Robyn; Lindström; Ekhé	3:44
4.	"Do You Know (What It Takes)"	Robyn; Denniz Pop; Max Martin; Herbie Crichlow	3:39
5.	"The Last Time"	Robyn; Lindström; Ekhé	4:40
6.	"Just Another Girlfriend"	Robyn; Christian Falk	5:20
7.	"Don't Want You Back"	Robyn; Lindström; Ekhé	4:00
8.	"Do You Really Want Me (Show Respect)"	Robyn; Lindström; Ekhé	4:25
9.	"How"	Robyn; Lindström; Ekhé	4:38
10.	"Here We Go"	Robyn; Anders Bagge; Harry Sommerdahl	4:43
11.	"Where Did Our Love Go"	Robyn; Bagge	5:18
12.	"Robyn Is Here"	Robyn; Falk	5:25
13.	"I Wish" (a cappella live at Radio Nova)	Robyn	2:30
Total length:			56:30

Robyn Is Here – Japanese edition
No.	Title	Length
14.	"You've Got That Somethin'" (Marco's hard mix)	4:51
Total length:		61:21

Robyn Is Here – International edition and Swedish reissue
No.	Title	Music	Length
6.	"Show Me Love"	Robyn; Martin	3:47
7.	"Just Another Girlfriend"	Robyn; Falk	5:20
8.	"Don't Want You Back"	Robyn; Lindström; Ekhé	4:00
9.	"Do You Really Want Me (Show Respect)"	Robyn; Lindström; Ekhé	4:25
10.	"How"	Robyn; Lindström; Ekhé	4:38
11.	"Here We Go"	Robyn; Bagge; Sommerdahl	4:43
12.	"Robyn Is Here"	Robyn; Falk	5:25
13.	"I Wish" (a cappella live at Radio Nova)	Robyn	2:30
Total length:			54:59

Robyn Is Here – Japanese reissue
No.	Title	Length
14.	"Do You Know (What It Takes)" (Allstar short)	3:56
15.	"Show Me Love" (Blue Hill remix)	3:47
Total length:		62:42

Robyn's Best
No.	Title	Length
1.	"Do You Know (What It Takes)"	3:39
2.	"Do You Really Want Me (Show Respect)"	4:25
3.	"Show Me Love"	3:47
4.	"Bumpy Ride"	4:09
5.	"In My Heart"	3:59
6.	"You've Got That Somethin'"	3:44
7.	"Don't Want You Back"	4:00
8.	"Here We Go"	4:43
9.	"How"	4:38
10.	"The Last Time"	4:40
Total length:		41:57

== Personnel ==
=== Musicians ===
- Robyn – vocals (all tracks); background vocals (tracks 4)
- Jeanette Söderholm – background vocals (tracks 4)
- Johan Ekhé – background vocal arrangement (tracks 6, 12)
- Mogge Sseruwagi – additional background vocals (tracks 7)
- Joe Watts – additional background vocals (tracks 10)
- Picks Sjöholm – guitars (tracks 1, 3, 8)
- Henrik Janson – guitars (tracks 10)
- Mattias Thorell – guitars (tracks 12)
- Christian "Falcon" Falk – keyboards (tracks 6, 12)
- Niklas Medin – additional keyboards (tracks 6)
- Päl Svenre – additional keyboards (tracks 12)
- Per "Rusk Träsk" Johansson – saxophone (tracks 3)
- Goran Kajfes – trumpet (tracks 3)
- Ronny Farsund – horns (tracks 10)
- S.N.Y.K.O. – strings (tracks 10, 11)
- Janson & Janson – string arrangement (tracks 10, 11)

=== Technical ===
- Ulf Lindström – production, arrangement, recording & mixing (tracks 1–3, 5, 7–9); vocal production (track 11)
- Johan Ekhé – production, arrangement, recording & mixing (tracks 1–3, 5, 7–9); vocal production (track 11)
- Denniz Pop – production, arrangement, recording & mixing (track 4)
- Max Martin – production, arrangement, recording & mixing (track 4)
- Christian "Falcon" Falk – production, arrangement, recording & mixing (track 6, 12)
- Anders "BAG" Bagge – production, arrangement, recording & mixing (track 10, 11); vocal production (track 11)
- Ronny Lahti – mixing (track 6, 12)
- Harry "Slick Harry" Sommerdahl – recording & mixing (track 10); co-production (track 11)
- Björn Engelmann – mastering
- Håkan Wollgård – engineering
- Anders Lundin – assistant engineering
- Peter Swartling – creative direction & executive production
- Alex Strehl – creative direction & art direction
- Marlene Waltman – hair & makeup
- Miles Cockfield – stylist
- Christian Coinbergh – photography

== Charts ==
=== Weekly charts ===
Chart (1995)	Peak position
Swedish Albums (Sverigetopplistan)	8

Chart (1997–98)	Peak position
Australian Albums (ARIA)	130
Canada Top Albums/CDs (RPM)	21
Dutch Albums (Album Top 100)	62
French Albums (SNEP)	68
UK R&B Albums (Official Charts)	26
US Billboard 200	57
US Heatseekers Albums (Billboard)	1
US Top R&B/Hip-Hop Albums (Billboard)	51

=== Year-end charts ===
Chart (1995)	Position
Swedish Albums (Sverigetopplistan)	25

Chart (1996)	Position
Swedish Albums (Sverigetopplistan)	64

Chart (1997)	Position
Canadian Albums (SoundScan)	64
Canadian R&B Albums (SoundScan)	11

Chart (1998)	Position
Canadian Albums (RPM)	84
Canadian Albums (SoundScan)	103
Canadian R&B Albums (SoundScan)	15
US Billboard 200	130

== Certifications ==
Region	Certification	Certified units/sales
Canada (Music Canada)	2× Platinum	200,000^{^}
Denmark (IFPI Danmark)	Gold	25,000^{^}
Sweden (GLF)	Gold	50,000^{^}
United States (RIAA)	Platinum	1,000,000^{^}
^{^} Shipments figures based on certification alone.

== Release history ==
Region	Date	Format	Album	Label
Sweden	13 October 1995	CD	Robyn Is Here	Ricochet; Ariola; BMG
Japan	21 February 1996	CD	Robyn Is Here	BMG
United States	24 June 1997	CD; cassette	Robyn Is Here	RCA
Canada	24 June 1997	CD; cassette	Robyn Is Here	RCA
United Kingdom	9 March 1998	CD; cassette	Robyn Is Here	RCA
United States	1 June 2004	CD	Robyn's Best	BMG
