= Do You Really Want Me (Show Respect) =

1995 single by Robyn

- Swedish artwork

Single by Robyn

from the album Robyn Is Here
- B-side: "Robyn Is Here"
- Released: 11 September 1995
- Genre: Pop; R&B; dance-pop; soul
- Length: 3:59
- Label: Ariola; Ricochet; BMG
- Songwriters: Robyn; Ulf Lindström; Johan Ekhé
- Producers: Ulf Lindström; Johan Ekhé

Robyn singles chronology
"You've Got That Somethin'" (1995)	"Do You Really Want Me (Show Respect)" (1995)	"Do You Know (What It Takes)" (1996)

Robyn UK singles chronology
"Show Me Love" (1997)	"Do You Really Want Me (Show Respect)" (1998)	"Konichiwa Bitches" (2007)

Robyn US singles chronology
"Show Me Love" (1997)	"Do You Really Want Me (Show Respect)" (1998)	"With Every Heartbeat" (2008)

Alternative cover
- UK CD1 artwork, also used for European and Australian releases

"Do You Really Want Me (Show Respect)" is a song by Swedish singer and songwriter Robyn, released as the second single from her first album, Robyn Is Here (1995). The song was released in September 1995 and became a top-20 hit in Denmark, Iceland, Norway and Sweden. On the Eurochart Hot 100, the song peaked at number 60 in December 1995. It was not released in the United Kingdom or the United States until 1998. In the US, it was Robyn's final single release there until her 2008 comeback. It was also the final single release from Robyn for nine years in the UK until "Konichiwa Bitches" was released as the first single from her fourth album, Robyn, in 2007. There were produced three different music videos of the song; two for the 1995 version and one for the 1998 version.

== Critical reception ==
Larry Flick from Billboard magazine described the song as a "engaging third single from her fun debut", noting that "in its original Ulf Lindstrom/Johan Ekhé production, the song is a chipper, hip hop-inflected ditty with infectious kid-pop energy and a nursery rhyme-like hook. Recut with Q.D.3 at the helm, it has become a sultry, Teena Marie-esque soul shuffler that's clearly designed to attract an older and more varied audience to the party." He added that "in fact, it leaves you properly intrigued and anxious to hear more."

Pan-European magazine Music & Media commented that "the part nagging/part soulful vocals of this Swedish singer and the mid-tempo groove that comfortably chugs along make for a pleasant and casual pop/dance tune." Later in 1998, when released in the UK, Music & Media stated that the new version is a "lush midtempo ballad".

== Chart performance ==
In Sweden, "Do You Really Want Me" became Robyn's first top-10 hit, peaking at number two, becoming her highest-charting single until "Dancing on My Own" reached number one in 2010. In the US, the single peaked at number 10 on the Billboard Mainstream Top 40 airplay chart. In the UK, "Do You Really Want Me" became Robyn's second-biggest hit, peaking at number 20. The song also peaked at number 43 in New Zealand.

== Track listings ==
- Swedish maxi-CD single
1. "Do You Really Want Me (Show Respect)" (Daddy C's Mekka Mix) – 6:07
2. "Do You Really Want Me (Show Respect)" (Smooth Butter Mix) – 4:56
3. "Do You Really Want Me (Show Respect)" (Mad Love Mix) – 3:53
4. "Do You Really Want Me (Show Respect)" (Gecko's Urban Mix) – 5:55
- UK CD 1
1. "Do You Really Want Me (Show Respect)" (single edit)
2. "Do You Really Want Me (Show Respect)" (QD3 edit)
3. "Do You Really Want Me (Show Respect)" (So Groovy mix)
4. "Robyn Is Here"
- UK CD 2
1. "Do You Really Want Me (Show Respect)" (single edit)
2. "Do You Really Want Me (Show Respect)" (Smooth Butter mix)
3. "Do You Really Want Me (Show Respect)" (Mad Love mix)
4. "Do You Really Want Me (Show Respect)" (Gecko's Urban mix)
5. "Do You Really Want Me (Show Respect)" (Daddy C's Mekka mix)

== Personnel ==
- Lyrics – Robyn
- Music and vocal arrangement – Robyn, Ulf Lindström, Johan Ekhé
- Arrangement and production – Ulf Lindström, Johan Ekhé

== Charts ==
=== Weekly charts ===
Chart (1995–1998)	Peak position
Canada Top Singles (RPM)	6
Canada Adult Contemporary (RPM)	22
Denmark (IFPI)	4
Estonia (Eesti Top 20)	2
Europe (Eurochart Hot 100)	60
Europe (European Dance Radio)	11
Iceland (Íslenski Listinn Topp 40)	13
New Zealand (Recorded Music NZ)	43
Norway (VG-lista)	7
Scottish Singles Sales (Official Charts)	20
Sweden (Sverigetopplistan)	2
UK Singles (Official Charts)	20
UK Hip Hop/R&B (Official Charts)	6
US Radio Songs (Billboard)	32
US Pop Airplay (Billboard)	10

=== Year-end charts ===
Chart (1995)	Position
Sweden (Topplistan)	7

Chart (1998)	Position
Canada Top Singles (RPM)	58
US Mainstream Top 40 (Billboard)	49

== Certifications ==
Region	Certification	Certified units/sales
Sweden (GLF)	Gold	25,000^{^}
^{^} Shipments figures based on certification alone.

== Release history ==
Region	Date	Format(s)	Label(s)	Ref(s).
Sweden	11 September 1995	CD	Ariola; Ricochet; BMG	
Japan	21 February 1996	CD	BMG	
United States	2 March 1998	Urban contemporary radio	RCA	
United Kingdom	18 May 1998	CD; cassette	RCA; BMG	
