= Show Me Love (Robyn song) =

1997 single by Robyn

Single by Robyn

from the album Robyn Is Here
- B-side: "Do You Know (What It Takes)"
- Released: 24 February 1997
- Studio: Cheiron (Stockholm, Sweden)
- Genre: Teen pop; dance-pop
- Length: 3:50 (album version); 3:27 (radio edit)
- Label: Ariola; Ricochet; BMG
- Songwriters: Robyn; Max Martin
- Producers: Denniz Pop; Max Martin

Robyn singles chronology
"Do You Know (What It Takes)" (1996)	"Show Me Love" (1997)	"Electric" (1999)

Robyn UK and US singles chronology
"Do You Know (What It Takes)" (1996)	"Show Me Love" (1997)	"Do You Really Want Me (Show Respect)" (1997)

Music video
- "Show Me Love" on YouTube

"Show Me Love" is a song by Swedish singer and songwriter Robyn. It was first released in Sweden in February 1997 as the fourth single from her debut studio album, Robyn Is Here (1995). The song was her third UK and second US single. Robyn wrote it with Max Martin, who also produced the song with Denniz Pop. The accompanying music video was directed by Kevin Bray. The song is sometimes confused with Robin S.'s 1993 single "Show Me Love" because of identical song titles and similar first names; however, the two songs are not related.

== Critical reception ==
Larry Flick from Billboard magazine described the song as a "far more seductive tone of this jeep-pop confection" than her earlier hit single, "Do You Know (What It Takes)". He noted that Robyn "proves her capability to handle a meaty tune with a respectable degree of soul. She tweaks the song's ear-grabbing chorus and muscular bassline with subtle improvisations and an assertive edge that impresses." In a retrospective review, Can't Stop the Pop felt that on the song "she's dropping her guard and committing herself to a teen-pop romance". They also complimented the chorus as "spectacularly catchy". British magazine Music Week gave "Show Me Love" a full score of five out of five, naming it the "strongest track" from the album, "[that] should launch her as a serious contender for the swingbeat crown".

== Chart performance ==
In Sweden, "Show Me Love" became Robyn's fourth highest-charting single, peaking at number 14, lower than "Do You Know (What It Takes)" and "Do You Really Want Me (Show Respect)", which both made it into the top 10. In the United States, the single peaked at number seven, her second consecutive top 10 hit. In December 1997, the single received a gold certification from the RIAA in recognition of 500,000 copies sold in the US. It was Robyn's last top-10 single and remains her last charting single on the Hot 100. In the United Kingdom, "Show Me Love" became Robyn's first of two top-20 singles from Robyn Is Here and her first top-10 single, peaking at number eight; it was Robyn's fourth best-performing single, with 113,000 sales and 1.22 million audio streams according to the Official Charts Company.

== Music video ==
The music video for "Show Me Love" was directed by American director Kevin Bray and premiered on 20 July 1997 on the television network The Box. The video is shot with two cutscenes: one with Robyn in a light blue top alone lip-syncing to camera filmed in mostly color and the other of her in a black sweatsuit lip-syncing to camera filmed in mostly black-and-white with a large group of urbane extras shown conversing in a loosely grouped line behind her while a guitarist, keytar player, and drummer with drumkit play among them.

== Usage in media ==
The song features on the soundtrack of the sitcom Sabrina, the Teenage Witch. It was also played at the very end of the Swedish film Show Me Love. The film was originally titled Fucking Åmål but was retitled for distribution in the English-speaking world after the name of the song.

In 2019 the song was featured in the West End musical & Juliet.

== Impact and legacy ==
In 2017, Billboard magazine ranked "Show Me Love" number 32 in their list of "The 100 Greatest Pop Songs of 1997". In 2022, Pitchfork ranked it number 241 in their list of "The 250 Best Songs of the 1990s".

== Track listings ==
- European CD single
1. "Show Me Love" (radio edit) – 3:27
2. "Show Me Love" (QD3 Fat Boy Mix) (featuring O.C. and Rahzel) – 5:08
3. "Show Me Love" (Grand Jury Master Mix with Rap) (featuring Shelene) – 4:28
4. "Do You Know (What It Takes)" (Paradise Garage Mix) – 4:59
- European maxi-CD single
1. "Show Me Love" (Radio Edit) – 3:27
2. "Show Me Love" (Grand Jury Master Mix with Rap) – 4:28
3. "Show Me Love" (QD3 Fat Boy Remix) (featuring O.C. and Rahzel) – 5:08
4. "Show Me Love" (12-inch Show) – 8:08
5. "Show Me Love" (Backroom Extended Club) – 7:18
- US CD single
1. "Show Me Love" (album version) – 3:50
2. "Show Me Love" (Grand Jury Master Mix with Rap) – 4:28
- US maxi-CD single
1. "Show Me Love" (extended album version) – 4:53
2. "Show Me Love" (12-inch Show) – 8:08
3. "Show Me Love" (Grand Jury Master Mix with Rap) – 4:28
4. "Show Me Love" (QD3 Fat Boy Remix) (featuring O.C. and Rahzel) – 5:08
- US 12-inch single

A1. "Show Me Love" (12-inch Show) – 8:08
A2. "Show Me Love" (extended LP version) – 4:53
B1. "Show Me Love" (Grand Master Jury Mix with Rap) – 4:28
B2. "Show Me Love" (Backroom 12-inch) – 7:18

- US 12-inch limited edition

A1. "Show Me Love" (Andy & The Lamboy Revelation Club Mix) – 8:22
A2. "Show Me Love" (Spens Nitemare Dub) – 4:58
B1. "Show Me Love" (Paul Andrews Club Mix) – 6:41
B2. "Show Me Love" (extended album version) – 4:53

== Charts ==
=== Weekly charts ===
Weekly chart performance for "Show Me Love"
Chart (1997–1998)	Peak position
Australia (ARIA)	34
Belgium (Ultratip Bubbling Under Flanders)	12
Canada Top Singles (RPM)	2
Canada Adult Contemporary (RPM)	12
Canada Dance/Urban (RPM)	4
Europe (Eurochart Hot 100)	32
France (SNEP)	36
Germany (GfK)	70
Netherlands (Dutch Top 40)	23
Netherlands (Single Top 100)	27
New Zealand (Recorded Music NZ)	10
Scottish Singles Sales (Official Charts)	20
Sweden (Sverigetopplistan)	14
UK Singles (Official Charts)	8
UK Dance (Official Charts)	22
UK Hip Hop/R&B (Official Charts)	1
US Billboard Hot 100	7
US Adult Pop Airplay (Billboard)	26
US Dance Singles Sales (Billboard)	39
US Hot R&B/Hip-Hop Songs (Billboard)	44
US Pop Airplay (Billboard)	3
US Rhythmic Airplay (Billboard)	9

=== Year-end charts ===
Year-end chart performance for "Show Me Love"
Chart (1997)	Position
Canada Top Singles (RPM)	44
Sweden (Topplistan)	79
US Rhythmic Top 40 (Billboard)	86
US Top 40/Mainstream (Billboard)	55

Chart (1998)	Position
Canada Top Singles (RPM)	41
Canada Adult Contemporary (RPM)	80
Europe Border Breakers (Music & Media)	15
UK Singles (OCC)	163
UK Urban (Music Week)	13
US Billboard Hot 100	29
US Adult Top 40 (Billboard)	67
US Mainstream Top 40 (Billboard)	26
US Rhythmic Top 40 (Billboard)	56

== Certifications ==
Region	Certification	Certified units/sales
United States (RIAA)	Gold	500,000^{^}
^{^} Shipments figures based on certification alone.

== Release history ==
Region	Date	Format(s)	Label(s)	Ref(s).
Sweden	24 February 1997	CD	Ariola; Ricochet; BMG	
United States	8–9 September 1997	Rhythmic contemporary; contemporary hit radio	RCA	
United States	28 October 1997	12-inch vinyl; CD; cassette	RCA	
United States	4 November 1997	Maxi CD	RCA	
Europe	4 November 1997	Maxi CD	RCA; BMG	
Japan	21 November 1997	CD	Ariola; BMG	
United Kingdom	23 February 1998	12-inch vinyl; CD; cassette	RCA; BMG	
