= Borås Tidning =

Swedish daily newspaper published in Borås

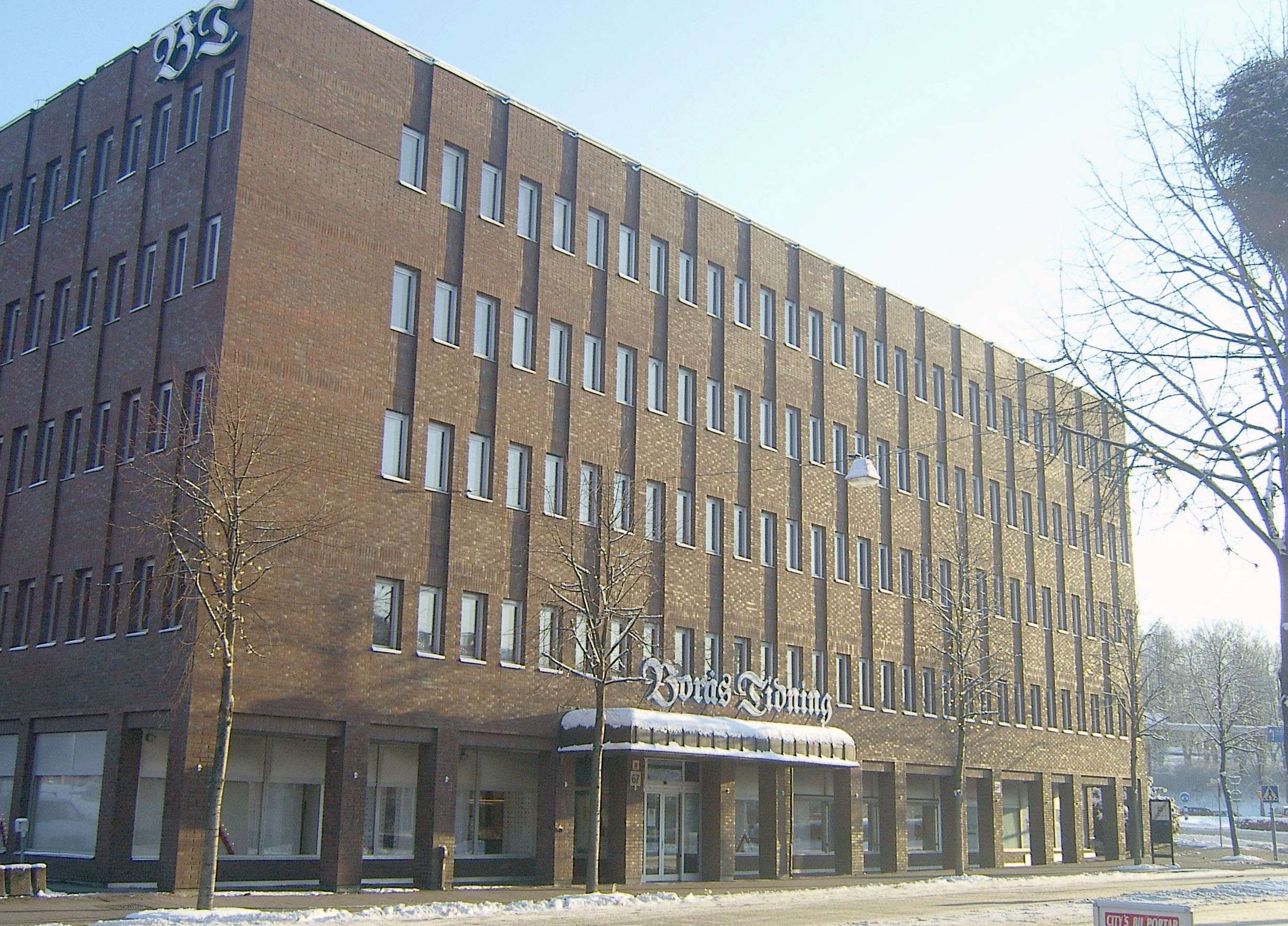
- The editorial office of the newspaper
- Format: Tabloid
- Owner: Gota Media AB
- Founded: 1838; 187 years ago
- Language: Swedish language
- Headquarters: Borås
- Circulation: 41,300 (2013)
- ISSN: 1103-9132
- Website: www.bt.se

Borås Tidning is a Swedish language daily newspaper published in Borås, Sweden.

== History and profile ==
Borås Tidning was established as the Borås Weckoblad on 1 September 1826. The paper has its headquarters in Borås. It had two predecessors, Borås Weckoblad (1826–1833) and Borås Nya Tidning (1834–1838). From 1898 to 2003 Borås Tidning was published by a stock corporation, AB Borås Tidning. In 2003 the paper merged with three newspapers, namely Blekinge Läns Tidning, Barometern and Smålandsposten, to create the joint holding company Gota Media. Borås Tidning is owned by Gota Media AB and has Stefan Eklund as the chief editor.

Borås Tidning was published in broadsheet format until Spring 2005 when it switched to tabloid format. From 1967 to 2011, the paper included a weekly Finnish language page but it was discontinued because it lost its functionality as reported by the publisher. It has a politically conservative leaning.

== Circulation ==
In 2003 Borås Tidning had a circulation of 50,100 copies. The circulation of the paper was 45,200 copies in 2010. It was 43,000 copies in 2012 and 41,300 copies in 2013.
