= Do You Know (What It Takes) =

1996 song by Robyn

- One of the Swedish CD single artwork variants

Single by Robyn

from the album Robyn Is Here
- Released: 22 January 1996
- Studio: Cheiron (Stockholm, Sweden)
- Genre: Dance-pop; R&B; pop-soul
- Length: 3:43 (album version); 3:33 (radio edit)
- Label: Ariola; Ricochet; BMG
- Songwriters: Robyn; Herbie Crichlow; Denniz Pop; Max Martin
- Producers: Denniz Pop; Max Martin

Robyn singles chronology
"Do You Really Want Me (Show Respect)" (1995)	"Do You Know (What It Takes)" (1996)	"Show Me Love" (1997)

Robyn UK singles chronology
"You've Got That Somethin'" (1996)	"Do You Know (What It Takes)" (1996)	"Show Me Love" (1997)

Robyn US singles chronology
"Do You Know (What It Takes)" (1997)	"Show Me Love" (1997)

Music video
- "Do You Know (What It Takes)" on YouTube

"Do You Know (What It Takes)" is a song by Swedish singer and songwriter Robyn, released as the third single from her debut studio album, Robyn Is Here (1995). In Sweden, it was issued as Robyn's third single in January 1996, while in the United States, it was released as her debut single the following year. The song was written by Robyn, Herbie Crichlow, Denniz Pop, and Max Martin, and it was produced by Pop and Martin.

In Robyn's native Sweden, "Do You Know (What It Takes)" was her second top-10 hit, peaking at number 10. It was her first top-10 single in the United States, reaching number seven on the Billboard Hot 100. In August 1998, the single was certified gold in the US by the Recording Industry Association of America (RIAA) for sales of 500,000 copies. The single was slightly less successful in the United Kingdom, peaking at number 26 after a re-release in August 1997. Two different versions of the music video for the song were produced; the US version was directed by Kevin Bray.

== Background ==
In an 1995-interview, Robyn told about the song, "'Do You Know (What It Takes)' is about respect. The girl in the song is asking her boyfriend if he's as much into the relationship as she is, because if he's not he can just get out of there. You shouldn't stick with someone because you don't want to be alone."

== Critical reception ==
AllMusic editor Stephen Thomas Erlewine described the song as "dynamite" in his review of the Robyn Is Here album. Larry Flick from Billboard magazine named it a "bright'n'bouncy ditty" and a "youth-driven smash". He complimented the singer's "oh-so-charming presence, which is sorta a hybrid of Brandy and Monica with a pinch of Mariah Carey", adding that Robyn "makes the most of the song's irresistibly sweet chorus and finger-poppin' funky backbeat." Dave Sholin from the Gavin Report noted that "rarely does word about a record spread as quickly as it has for this Swedish production." Pan-European magazine Music & Media stated that the 16-year old Robyn "has mastered the R&B genre to a T", noting that she "supplies the sassy rhymes, while master-producer [Denniz] Pop takes care of the perky beats and poppy arrangements."

A reviewer from Music Week gave "Do You Know (What It Takes)" a score of four out of five, adding that the singer "delivers a slick uptempo number which could see her make the Top 40". It was also described as "irresistible". Kirstin Watson from Smash Hits also gave it four out of five, naming it a "happy ditty" and a "right catchy little number". Ian Hyland from Sunday Mirror gave it nine out of ten, commenting, "Exploding the myth that Swedish popsters are all Paul Calf haircuts and Magnum moustaches, the girl Robyn shows she sure can funk. Large summer chorus in the house." David Sinclair from The Times called it a "pouting, pop-soul confection".

== Music video ==
There were made two different versions of the music video for "Do You Know (What It Takes)"; a European version and a US version. The latter was directed by American director Kevin Bray. The European version was later made available on Robyn's official YouTube channel in October 2009, and had generated more than 3.2 million views as of March 2026. In the European version Robyn is depicted in multiple different outfits and sitting on a metallic silver sofa. In the American version Robyn is diving a large black van, riding in the back which is covered in shag carpet and she is sitting in an egg chair. She then climbs on top on the van in a traffic jam and sings on the roof with a microphone stand.

== Track listings ==
- Swedish CD single
1. "Do You Know (What It Takes)" (radio edit) – 3:30
2. "Do You Know (What It Takes)" (Allstar Short) – 3:58
- Swedish maxi-CD single
1. "Do You Know (What It Takes)" (radio edit) – 3:30
2. "Do You Know (What It Takes)" (Allstar Main & Rap) – 4:59
3. "Do You Know (What It Takes)" (Paradise Garage Mix) – 4:59
4. "Do You Know (What It Takes)" (E-Smoove Bounce Mix Edit) – 4:05
- UK CD single
1. "Do You Know (What It Takes)" (radio edit) - 3:30
2. "Do You Know (What It Takes)" (Allstar mix – main and rap) - 4:59
3. "Do You Know (What It Takes)" (E-Smoove Bounce mix) - 4:05
4. "Do You Know (What It Takes)" (Paradise Garage mix) - 4:59
5. "Do You Know (What It Takes)" (125th Street mix) - 4:07
- US CD single
1. "Do You Know (What It Takes)" (LP version) – 3:43
2. "Do You Know (What It Takes)" (E-Smoove Bounce Mix Edit) – 4:06
3. "Do You Know (What It Takes)" (Dee's Full Mix Edit) – 4:02

== Personnel ==
- Lyrics – Robyn, Herbie Crichlow
- Music – Robyn, Denniz Pop, Max Martin, Herbie Crichlow
- Arrangement, production, recording and mixing – Denniz Pop, Max Martin

== Charts ==
=== Weekly charts ===
Weekly chart performance for "Do You Know (What It Takes)"
Chart (1996–1997)	Peak position
Australia (ARIA)	48
Canada Top Singles (RPM)	2
Canada Adult Contemporary (RPM)	33
Canada Dance/Urban (RPM)	1
Europe (Eurochart Hot 100)	86
Israel (Israeli Singles Chart)	18
Netherlands (Dutch Top 40 Tipparade)	19
Netherlands (Single Top 100)	82
Scottish Singles Sales (Official Charts)	41
Sweden (Sverigetopplistan)	10
UK Singles (Official Charts)	26
UK Hip Hop/R&B (Official Charts)	7
US Billboard Hot 100	7
US Adult Pop Airplay (Billboard)	35
US Hot R&B/Hip-Hop Songs (Billboard)	33
US Pop Airplay (Billboard)	3

=== Year-end charts ===
Year-end chart performance for "Do You Know (What It Takes)"
Chart (1997)	Position
Canada Top Singles (RPM)	30
Canada Dance/Urban (RPM)	21
US Billboard Hot 100	29
US Rhythmic Top 40 (Billboard)	34
US Top 40/Mainstream (Billboard)	13

== Certifications ==
Certifications for "Do You Know (What It Takes)"
Region	Certification	Certified units/sales
United States (RIAA)	Gold	700,000

== Release history ==
Release history and formats for "Do You Know (What It Takes)"
Region	Date	Format(s)	Label(s)	Ref.
Sweden	22 January 1996	CD	Ariola; Ricochet; BMG	
United Kingdom	4 November 1996	12-inch vinyl; CD; cassette	RCA; BMG	
United States	6 May 1997	Rhythmic contemporary radio	RCA; BMG	
United States	13 May 1997	12-inch vinyl; CD; cassette	RCA; BMG	
Europe	July 1997	Radio; CD	RCA; BMG	
United Kingdom (re-release)	4 August 1997	12-inch vinyl; CD; cassette	RCA; BMG	
Japan	21 August 1997	CD	Ariola; Ricochet; BMG	
