= Smålandsposten =

Swedish local newspaper

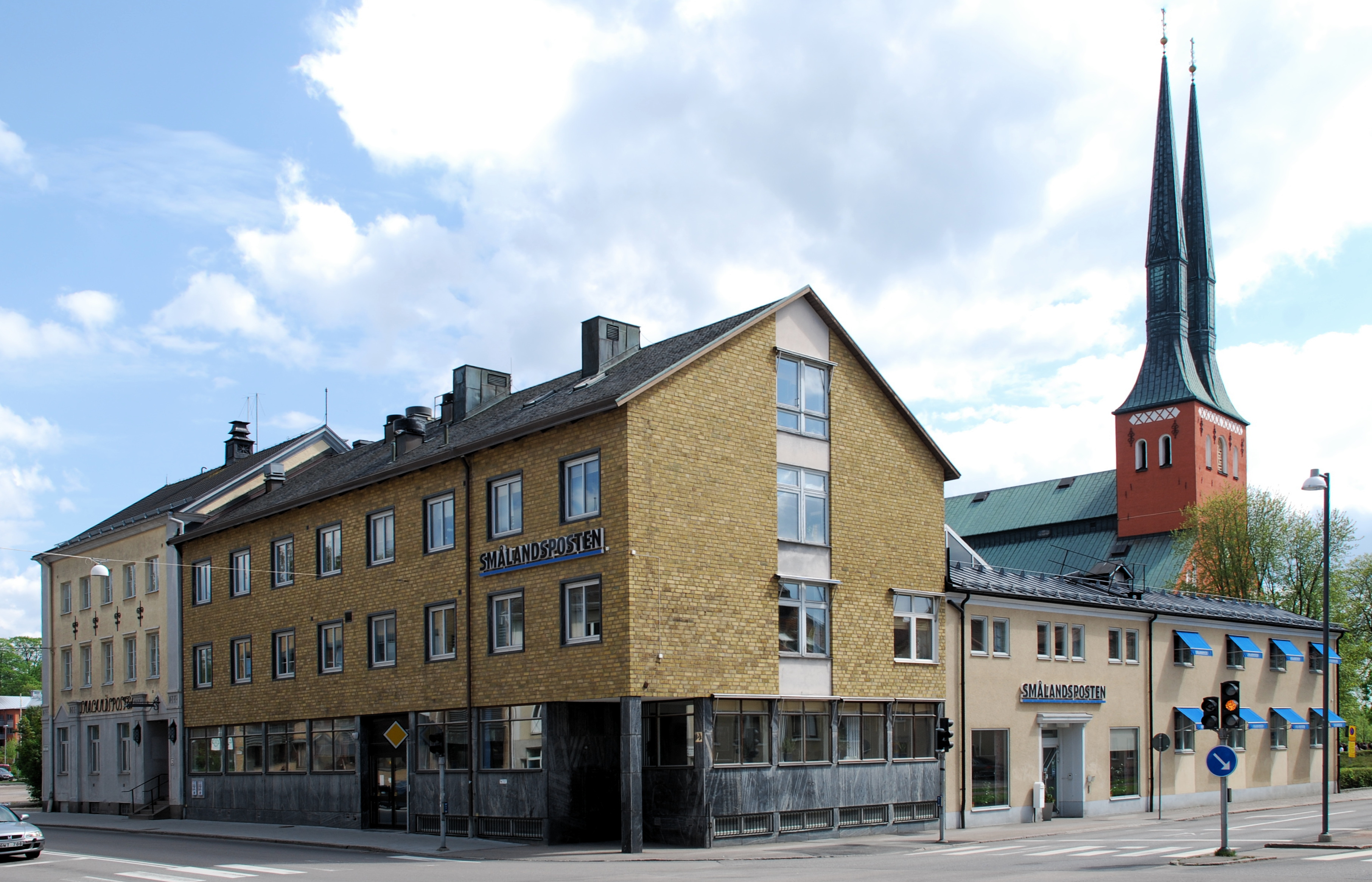
- Smålandsposten offices in Växjö
- Type: Daily newspaper
- Format: Tabloid
- Founded: 1866; 160 years ago
- Political alignment: Conservative
- Language: Swedish
- Headquarters: Växjö
- Country: Sweden
- ISSN: 1104-005X
- Website: Smålandsposten

Smålandsposten is a local morning newspaper published in Växjö, Southern Sweden. Founded in 1866 it is one of the earliest newspapers in the country.

== History and profile ==
Smålandsposten was established in 1866. The paper is based in Växjö and has been published in tabloid format since 1 March 2001. It has a conservative leaning and fully focuses on local news.

As of 2015 Magnus Karlsson was the editor-in-chief of the paper. When he resigned in January 2019 after serving in the post for 15 years Kristina Bingström was appointed to the post being the first female and sixteenth editor-in-chief of the daily.

Smålandsposten is the recipient of the European Newspaper Award of 2009 in the category of local newspaper for its spectacular reportages on local events.

In 2010 Smålandsposten sold 38,600 copies. The paper had a circulation of 35,400 copies in 2012 and 34,900 copies in 2013.
