= Sexistential =

Studio album by Robyn
- Released: 27 March 2026
- Length: 29:27
- Labels: Konichiwa; Young
- Producers: Klas Åhlund; Elvira Anderfjärd; Jonathan Bates; Oscar Holter; Joseph Mount; Robyn

Robyn chronology
Honey (2018)	Sexistential (2026)

Singles from Sexistential
- 1. "Dopamine" Released: 12 November 2025; 2. "Sexistential" / "Talk to Me" Released: 7 January 2026; 3. "Blow My Mind" Released: 11 March 2026

Sexistential is the ninth studio album by the Swedish singer Robyn, released on 27 March 2026 through Konichiwa Records and Young. The album was supported by singles "Dopamine", the double A-sides "Sexistential" and "Talk to Me", and "Blow My Mind". She began to work with Swedish producer Klas Åhlund to provide a sound that would be reminiscent of her previous project, Body Talk (2010) trilogy.

== Background and development ==
Robyn returned to working with Swedish producer Klas Åhlund for the album, choosing the sound to be reminiscent of her 2010's Body Talk trilogy. Talking about the album, she stated that Sexistential feels "like a spaceship coming through the atmosphere at a really high speed and crash landing. That's how I felt, like I'd had all these experiences searching too far out into space, and now I'm crashing back into myself". The topics so far known to be approached in the music let the listener in more personal parts of Robyn's life as a new single mother, while keeping to gravitate around the concepts of physicality, desire and dance.

== Release and promotion ==
=== Title ===
Sexistential takes its title as a combination of the words sex and existential, with PinkNews referring to the title as an "idea of one's existence being tied to sensuality". Originally an in-joke, Robyn soon found the title described the album and its direction, stating that it "doesn't even have to be about sex, but it's feeling sensual and attracted to things that I enjoy, and not letting anything take over that".

=== Live performances ===
Robyn performed "Dopamine" for the first time on 19 November 2025 at a surprise show in Los Angeles at the Fonda Theatre. The show was her first concert since 2019 and was hosted by Spotify and Acne Studios. On 31 December, she performed in Times Square, New York City, for CNN's New Year's Eve Live with Anderson Cooper and Andy Cohen.

On 1 and 2 January 2026, Robyn performed at the Brooklyn Paramount. The event, titled Robyn and Friends, included performances by musicians such as Dee Diggs, Olof Dreijer of the Knife, and Kindness. Five days later, she performed "Sexistential" on The Late Show with Stephen Colbert. Robyn was the supporting act for Harry Styles during ten concerts at the Johan Cruyff Arena in May 2026, as part of his Together, Together tour.

=== Singles ===
Sexistential's lead single "Dopamine" was released on 12 November 2025. "Sexistential" and "Talk to Me" served as the album's second single as a double A-side release on 7 January 2026. A reworked rendition of her 2002 song "Blow My Mind" was released on 11 March as the album's third single.

== Critical reception ==
Professional ratings
Aggregate scores
Source	Rating
AnyDecentMusic?	8.2/10
Metacritic	84/100
Review scores
Source	Rating
Associated Press	4/5 stars
DIY	4/5 stars
Financial Times	4/5 stars
The Guardian	4/5 stars
Our Culture	4/5 stars
PopMatters	7/10
Riff	8/10
Rolling Stone	4/5 stars
Slant	4/5 stars
The Times	4/5 stars

According to the review aggregator Metacritic, Sexistential received "universal acclaim" based on a weighted average score of 84 out of 100 from twenty-three critic scores. AnyDecentMusic? gave the album a score of 8.2 out of 10 based on twenty-two reviews.

Maria Sherman of Associated Press gave Sexistential a four out of five star review, describing it as "nine-tracks of shimmering synths, ascendant choruses, and rebellious pop songs that double as emotional life rafts." DIY wrote that the album "takes the essence of what has driven" Robyn's career through her discography. The Guardian's Katie Hawthorne remarked that the album returned Robyn to her "trademark skin-tingling electro bangers" following 2018's Honey and compared the project to 2010's Body Talk. In a review for PopMatters, Nick Malone wrote that Sexistential "embodies the contradiction in Robyn herself at this juncture of her career: she's the blueprint, so she refers to herself." Writing for Riff, Vera Maksymiuk felt that the album began to "pull back the veil" of Robyn three decades into her career. She further remarked its perspective and sound is what made Sexistential compelling.

Rolling Stone and its UK edition gave Sexistential four-out-of-five star reviews. Writing for the former, Rob Sheffield described the album as confronting the emotional damage of her past while exploring the new-found freedom of her present and future. For the latter, Will Richards echoed Sheffield's review, remarking that the album showcases the singer's growth. Slant echoed reviews from DIY, The Guardian, and PopMatters in agreeing that with the album, Robyn has kept her signature sound. Additionally, they made note of Robyn's use of Gen X language, comparing it to that of Katy Perry ("trying to resurrect pussyhat feminism") and Taylor Swift ("dubiously invoking the term 'dickmatize'"), calling it an "eager [...] plunge into glorious capital-C cringe [...] less like an attempt to stay hip than a cheeky disregard for sticking to anyone’s timeline—or artistic vision—but her own." Ludovic Hunter-Tilney of the Financial Times and The Times' Will Hodgkinson complimented the album for its sound and subject matter, especially Robyn's being a single mother and experiences with IVF.

Stereogum editor Tom Breihan explored Slant's opinion of Swift. In his review, he discussed Robyn's reunion with former collaborator Max Martin in comparison to Swift's most recent collaboration with him. Describing the latter as "an attempt to recapture some mysterious juice that Swift was worried about losing", he felt Robyn's was a "response to a very specific moment" her in life.

== Commercial performance ==
Sexistential debuted at number ten on the UK Albums Chart, becoming her highest charting album in the country.

== Track listing ==
Sexistential track listing
No.	Title	Writer(s)	Producer(s)	Length
1.	"Really Real"	Jonathan Bates; Joseph Mount; Klas Åhlund; Robyn Carlsson	Robyn; Bates; Mount; Åhlund	3:34
2.	"Dopamine"	Carlsson; Taio Cruz; Åhlund	Robyn; Åhlund	3:35
3.	"Blow My Mind"	Carlsson; Alexander Kronlund; Åhlund	Åhlund	2:57
4.	"Sucker for Love"	Mount; Åhlund; Carlsson; Svein Berge	Robyn; Mount; Åhlund	3:34
5.	"It Don't Mean a Thing"	Elvira Anderfjärd; Åhlund; Carlsson	Anderfjärd; Åhlund	3:06
6.	"Talk to Me"	Åhlund; Martin Sandberg; Oscar Holter; Carlsson	Åhlund; Holter	3:19
7.	"Sexistential"	Åhlund; Carlsson	Robyn; Åhlund	2:20
8.	"Light Up"	Åhlund; Markus Jägerstedt; Carlsson	Åhlund	3:24
9.	"Into the Sun"	Åhlund; Sandberg; Holter; Carlsson	Åhlund; Holter	3:38
Total length:				29:27

== Charts ==
Chart performance
Chart (2026)	Peak position
Australian Albums (ARIA)	12
Austrian Albums (Ö3 Austria)	36
Belgian Albums (Ultratop Flanders)	7
Belgian Albums (Ultratop Wallonia)	29
Danish Albums (Hitlisten)	17
Dutch Albums (Album Top 100)	41
Finnish Albums (Suomen virallinen lista)	36
French Physical Albums (SNEP)	66
German Albums (Offizielle Top 100)	14
German Pop Albums (Offizielle Top 100)	6
Irish Albums (IRMA)	58
Irish Independent Albums (IRMA)	6
New Zealand Albums (RMNZ)	28
Norwegian Albums (IFPI Norge)	13
Portuguese Albums (AFP)	122
Scottish Albums (Official Charts)	4
Spanish Albums (Promusicae)	72
Swedish Albums (Sverigetopplistan)	1
Swiss Albums (Schweizer Hitparade)	36
UK Albums (Official Charts)	10
UK Independent Albums (Official Charts)	3
US Billboard 200	128
US Independent Albums (Billboard)	20
US Top Dance Albums (Billboard)	7

== Release history ==
List of release dates
Date	Formats	Labels	Ref.
27 March 2026	Cassette; CD; digital download; LP; streaming	Konichiwa; Young	
