= Dopamine (Robyn song) =

Single by Robyn

from the album Sexistential
- Released: 12 November 2025
- Genre: Synth-pop
- Length: 3:35
- Label: Konichiwa; Young
- Songwriters: Robyn; Klas Åhlund; Taio Cruz
- Producers: Klas Åhlund; Robyn

Robyn singles chronology
"Life" (2024)	"Dopamine" (2025)	"Sexistential" / "Talk to Me" (2026)

Music video
- "Dopamine" on YouTube

"Dopamine" is a song by Swedish singer Robyn. It was released on 12 November 2025 through Konichiwa Records and Young as the lead single from her ninth studio album, Sexistential (2026). Robyn and Klas Åhlund produced the song and co-wrote it with Taio Cruz.

"Dopamine" was praised by music critics. It peaked at number nine on the Swedish singles chart and became her first top-ten entry on the chart since "Indestructible" (2010).

== Background and release ==
Robyn originally wrote "Dopamine" with Klas Åhlund in 2015. At one point, she sent an early demo to Daft Punk to see if they would be interested in producing it. When she returned to the studio in 2020, "Dopamine" was one of the first songs she revisited. In an interview for Vogue, she described the original version of the track: "Before Honey, I didn't really know how to make a pop album, and I knew this was a pop song. What I was making before was much more nonlinear. It didn't have choruses in the same way. It was referencing the way you listen to music in a club." Robyn and Åhlund then re-wrote the verses. Robyn is credited as the sole lyricist, while composer credit is shared between her, Åhlund, and Taio Cruz. Robyn and Åhlund produced the song.

Konichiwa and Young released "Dopamine" as a single on 12 November 2025, Robyn's first solo release since Honey (2018). It was followed by official remixes by Jamie xx and Marlon Hoffstadt.

== Composition and lyrics ==
"Dopamine" is a synth-pop song with lyrics speaking of not being able to control one's dopamine rushes. Robyn said, "The doubleness of 'Dopamine' is having an emotion that is super real, super strong, intense, enjoyable or painful, and at the same time knowing that this is just a biological process in my body." Alexis Petridis from The Guardian interpreted the lyrics as "about the first rush of falling in love" and noted "a curious tension between trying to explain attraction away as something scientific – an excess of the titular chemical – and something more spiritual and intangible". Music critics compared elements of the production to works by Daft Punk and Giorgio Moroder.

== Critical reception ==
"Dopamine" was met with overwhelmingly positive reviews from critics. Petridis, writing for The Guardian, called it an "unequivocal pop banger" and rated it four stars out of five. Pitchfork critic Harry Tafoya selected the song as "Best New Track" at the time of its release and wrote: "'Dopamine' is a gorgeous riff on a classic Robyn formula, taking the synthetic shimmer of a dance track and catalyzing its underlying passion with the warm caress of her voice." Similarly, Megan Lapierre of Exclaim! designated it a "Staff Pick" and deemed it "another worthy addition to Robyn's ubiquitous catalogue". Steffanee Wang of The Fader wrote that the singer "sounds fresh as ever" and singled out the latter part of the song as its best part, "when things get quiet before the beat drops back in like an hundred ton weight." Rolling Stone's Brittany Spanos called it a "euphoric dance floor banger".

== Chart performance ==
"Dopamine" debuted and peaked at number nine on the Sverigetopplistan singles chart, becoming her first top-ten entry in Sweden since "Indestructible" reached number four in 2010. "Dopamine" also reached number 98 in Norway and number 33 on the UK Singles Downloads chart.

== Music video ==
The accompanying music video for "Dopamine" was directed by Marili Andre, who also shot the single artwork.

== Live performances ==
Robyn premiered "Dopamine" live during a one-off concert hosted by Spotify and Acne Studios at the Fonda Theatre in Los Angeles on 19 November 2025. She performed the song during a New Year's Eve set at Times Square in New York City for CNN's New Year's Eve Live. Later that same night, she performed it in concert at the Brooklyn Paramount.

== Track listing ==
- Digital single
1. "Dopamine" – 3:35
- Digital single
1. "Dopamine" (Jamie xx remix) – 5:02
- Digital single
1. "Dopamine" (Marlon Hoffstadt remix) – 3:41

== Credits and personnel ==
Credits are adapted from Tidal.

- Robyn – composition, lyrics, production, vocals
- Taio Cruz – composition
- Niklas Flyckt – mixing
- Chris Gehringer – mastering
- Klas Åhlund – composition, production, programming

== Charts ==
Weekly chart performance for "Dopamine"
Chart (2025)	Peak position
Denmark Airplay (Hitlisten)	14
Germany Airplay (BVMI)	90
New Zealand Hot Singles (RMNZ)	29
Norway (VG-lista)	98
Sweden (Sverigetopplistan)	9
UK Singles Downloads (OCC)	33
US Hot Dance/Pop Songs (Billboard)	14

== Release history ==
Release history
Region	Date	Format(s)	Version(s)	Label(s)	Ref.
Various	12 November 2025	Digital download; streaming	Original	Konichiwa; Young	
Various	3 December 2025	Digital download; streaming	Jamie xx remix	Konichiwa; Young	
Various	15 December 2025	Digital download; streaming	Marlon Hoffstadt remix	Konichiwa; Young	
