= Talk to Me (Robyn song) =

Single by Robyn

from the album Sexistential
- A-side: "Sexistential"
- Released: 7 January 2026
- Genre: Dance-pop; synth-pop
- Length: 3:19
- Label: Konichiwa; Young
- Songwriters: Klas Åhlund; Max Martin; Oscar Holter; Robyn
- Producers: Klas Åhlund; Oscar Holter

Robyn singles chronology
"Dopamine" (2025)	"Talk to Me" / "Sexistential" (2026)	"Blow My Mind" (2026)

Zara Larsson singles chronology
"She Did It Again" (2026)	"Talk to Me, Zara" (2026)	"Blue Moon" (2026)

Music video
- "Talk to Me" on YouTube

"Talk to Me" is a song by Swedish singer Robyn from her ninth studio album, Sexistential (2026). Konichiwa and Young released it as the album's second single on 7 January 2026 as a double A-side with "Sexistential". A remix featuring fellow Swedish singer Zara Larsson was released on 28 July 2026.

== Background and composition ==
Robyn wrote the lyrics for "Talk to Me" during the COVID-19 pandemic "when there was no way to be physical"; she said, "I like talkers, that turns me on." Composer credit is shared between her, Klas Åhlund, Oscar Holter, and Max Martin. It marked her first collaboration with Martin since "Time Machine" from Body Talk (2010). Åhlund and Holter produced "Talk to Me", a dance-pop and synth-pop song and an "ode to phone sex and healthy communication".

== Release ==
"Talk to Me" was released on 7 January 2026, alongside the track "Sexistential". Coleman Spilde of Salon described "Talk to Me" as "passionate", and considered it "more accessible" compared to its A-side "Sexistential". The accompanying music video for "Talk to Me" was released simultaneously with the song, and was directed by Casper Sejersen.

== Remix ==
On 28 July 2026, a remix of "Talk to Me" with Zara Larsson was released, titled "Talk to Me, Zara". The remix follows Robyn and Larsson's previous collaboration "Puss Puss" from the latter artist's remix album, Midnight Sun: Girls Trip (2026). They performed the remix for the first time prior to its release, during Robyn's tour stop in Copenhagen as part of her Sexistential Tour. A video of the live performance accompanied the release.

== Track listing ==
- Digital single
1. "Talk to Me" – 3:19
2. "Sexistential" – 2:20
- Remix with Zara Larsson
1. "Talk to Me, Zara" – 3:13

== Credits and personnel ==
Credits are adapted from Tidal.

- Robyn – composition, lyrics, vocals
- Oscar Holter – composition, engineering, production, programming
- Max Martin – composition
- Tom Norris – mixing
- Chris Gehringer – mastering
- Klas Åhlund – composition, engineering, production, programming
- Zara Larsson - composition, lyrics (remix)

== Charts ==
=== Weekly charts ===
Weekly chart performance
Chart (2026)	Peak position
Canada Modern Rock (Billboard Canada)	36
Latvia Airplay (LaIPA)	9
Lithuania Airplay (TopHit)	33
Malta Airplay (Radiomonitor)	13
New Zealand Hot Singles (RMNZ)	18
North Macedonia Airplay (Radiomonitor)	6
Norway Airplay (IFPI Norge)	85
Sweden (Sverigetopplistan)	43
Sweden Airplay (Radiomonitor)	9
UK Singles Downloads (Official Charts)	43
US Hot Dance/Pop Songs (Billboard)	13

Chart performance for "Talk to Me, Zara"
Chart (2026)	Peak position
Estonia Airplay (TopHit)	194
Germany Airplay (BVMI)	78
Latvia Airplay (LaIPA)	16
New Zealand Hot Singles (RMNZ)	13
Sweden (Sverigetopplistan)	77
Sweden Airplay (Radiomonitor)	65

=== Monthly charts ===
Monthly chart performance
Chart (2026)	Peak position
Lithuania Airplay (TopHit)	53
