= Rather Die Young =

Song by Beyoncé

from the album 4
- Released: June 28, 2011
- Recorded: 2010
- Studio: MSR Studios and KMA Studios (New York City)
- Genre: Soul; Philadelphia soul; R&B
- Length: 3:42
- Label: Columbia
- Songwriters: Beyoncé Knowles; Jeff Bhasker; Luke Steele
- Producer: Jeff Bhasker

"Rather Die Young" is a song recorded by American singer Beyoncé for her fourth studio album, 4 (2011). Composed by Beyoncé, Jeff Bhasker, Luke Steele, the song's development was motivated by the fact that Beyoncé wanted a song that would help people through both their painful and happy moments. "Rather Die Young" is an R&B and Philadelphia soul power ballad that is instrumentally complete with synthesizers, a piano, a strummy guitar, and heavy drums, which were inspired by the work of the American band Earth, Wind & Fire. Lyrically, the song talks about the inability to fight what the heart wants. The female protagonist sings to an indifferent love interest, whom she likens to American actor James Dean and tells him that she prefers to die rather than live without him.

"Rather Die Young" was generally well received by contemporary music critics who described it as a dark, yet enchanting ballad. They highlighted Beyoncé's vocal power and the song's melody. Critics also noted that the ballad was heavily influenced by the 1980s R&B and soul music. However, some of them commented that it was barely distinguishable among the other songs on 4, criticizing its chorus which, according to them, forms the major part of the song. Following the release of 4, "Rather Die Young" charted at number 37 on the South Korea Gaon International Singles Chart, based on downloads alone. The song was part of Beyoncé's set list for her 4 Intimate Nights with Beyoncé shows, held at the Roseland Ballroom in New York City.

== Background and recording ==
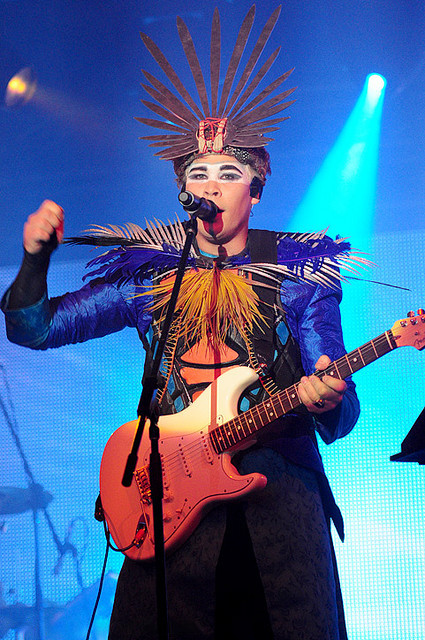
Luke Steele (pictured) co-wrote "Rather Die Young" with Beyoncé and Jeff Bhasker.

"Rather Die Young" was written and produced by Beyoncé, Jeff Bhasker, and Luke Steele at Enormous Studios, in Los Angeles, in 2011. Cole Kamen-Green, Alex Asher and Josiah Woodson played the trumpets while Nick Videen and Drew Sayers were on the tenor and alto saxophones. The horn were arranged by Shea Taylor. Jordan Young then recorded Beyoncé's vocals at the MSR Studios and KMA Studios, in New York City; Steele and Billy Kraven served as background vocalists. Tony Maserati mixed the track, while Pete Wolford, Ryan Kelly, Serge Nudel, Justin Hergett and Jon Castelli all assisted in the audio engineering of "Rather Die Young"; both tasks were executed at the RMC Studio, in Los Angeles. Speaking about what motivated her to record a song in the vein of "Rather Die Young", Beyoncé said: "I really want people to think when they listen to my music. I want it to help them through their painful memories, their painful moments, and their most happy moments. I want it to be a conversation."

== Composition and lyrical interpretation ==
"Rather Die Young" is an R&B-soul power ballad, which is heavily influenced by the 1990s R&B music and the 1970s soul music. Alexis Petridis of The Guardian commented that it refracts "a dramatic Philadelphia soul ballad through gauzy modern production". "Rather Die Young" also contains elements of retro pop music. The song is built on a heavy laid-back programmed drumbeat, which according to Thomas Conner of the Chicago Sun-Times, was inspired by the material of American band Earth, Wind & Fire. Additional instrumentation includes a horn section, a weave of synthesizers, a piano, a keyboard, and a strummy guitar. Priya Elan of NME noted that "Rather Die Young" gets close to the "smoky soul styling" of Anita Baker, before adding that its chorus bears similarities to Andrew Lloyd Webber's previous work and jazz hands. Jim Farber of The Daily News wrote that "'Rather Die Young' has a choir of Beyoncés" that recalls the harmonies of all-female singing group The Emotions. Simon Goddard of Q magazine compared the song with Massive Attack's "Protection" (1995) and also noted similarities with The Shangri-Las' songs.

'Rather Die Young'
A 23-second sample of "Rather Die Young", which contains elements of several music styles of the 1970s-90s. Knowles' vocals are accompanied by a heavy programmed drumbeat, horns, synthesizers and a strummy guitar as she sings about love without care of what others say.

Lyrically, "Rather Die Young" talks about the inability to fight what the heart wants, even if it is wrong. Beyoncé prostrates herself at the mercy of an indifferent love interest, telling him that she would rather die young than to live her life without him. Beyoncé also sings about leaving a legacy as she shows her "epic" neediness to her love interest, as stated by Genevieve Koski of The A.V. Club. The music stays soft in the first verse, where Beyoncé likens her romantic interest to American actor James Dean, "You're my James Dean / you make me feel like I'm seventeen". She also relates about how good girls often fall for bad boys; she affirms that "bad boy" she loves, "drive[s] too fast" and "smoke[s] too much". During the chorus, Beyoncé projects the image of a woman, who wants to love and be loved regardless of what others may say, "I'd rather die young / Than live my life without you / Rather not live at all". As the song progresses, Beyoncé references "some deeper emotional fires burning" as she sings, "Nobody understands what we've been through".

== Critical reception ==
The song received generally positive reviews. Joanne Dorken of MTV UK wrote that "Rather Die Young" is a "dark, yet enchanting... mesmerising" ballad, noting that as Beyoncé sings, she give listeners a sense of mystery. She also commended her "stunning vocals". Likewise, Chad Grischow of the website IGN wrote that the song gives Beyoncé's vocals room to shine with "some beautifully soft verses and [a] belted hook". Alexis Petridis of The Guardian called "Rather Die Young" a fantastic and dramatic song. Similarly, Rolling Stone's Matthew Perpetua wrote, "There's a great melodramatic kick to this song, which comes across like a quiet storm slow jam spiced up with modern drum programming. 'I'd rather not live at all than live my life without you' is an unusually self-pitying lyric for Beyoncé, but she sells it well regardless." Conrad Tao of Sputnikmusic showed high favoritism for the song, writing:

[Knowles'] utterance of 'you're my James Dean / you make me feel like I'm seventeen' on 'Rather Die Young' is made tolerable by her honeyed vocal slides. Certainly, the 'bad boy' Beyoncé is in love with is more a physical representation of countless painfully banal fantasies about guys who 'drive too fast' and 'smoke too much' than an actual person, but at least it feels tangible. For once, the pop song trying to make a connection with its listener doesn't feel like a total fraud. Forget Lady Gaga's song about her relationship with her father or Britney Spears' lullaby to her babies – here, I'm convinced, if only for a moment, that Beyoncé really would rather die young than to live her life without her lover, that she cares, even if you don't. This doesn't fully explain why 4 is as enjoyable as it is, but it does convey just how convincing Beyoncé can be when given the right tools – and it turns out that those tools consist of not much more than Beyoncé's voice itself.

Prefix magazine's Craig Jenkins found "retro-leaning flourishes and propulsive boom bap in equal measure" in "Rather Die Young". Likewise, Cameron Adams of the Herald Sun wrote that "Rather Die Young" is a "boundary-pushing backdrop of 1970s soul dragged into tomorrow", further describing it as bizarre but brilliant. Mikael Wood of Spin magazine described it as a slow-to-bloom song which is "preoccupied by love's pleasure". Ben Cardew of Music Week described "Rather Die Young" as a drum-heavy and gloomy ballad accompanied by a lovely melody. Jocelyn Vena of MTV News described the ballad as having an old-school vibe and commended how "instead of going hard, she [Beyoncé] keeps the music soft" Robert Copsey of the British entertainment and media news website Digital Spy noted similarities between "Rather Die Young" and Beyoncé's older material.

A mixed review came from Adam Markovitz of Entertainment Weekly, who compared Beyoncé's work on "Rather Die Young" to that of past idols such as Luther Vandross and Diana Ross, but felt the tone overshadowed her style, stating that "she gets lost in her idols' polyester-swathed shadows". Matthew Horton of BBC Online wrote that the ballad is less successful than the other songs on 4 because of its "overdone glitz". Similarly, NME's Hamish MacBain classified "Rather Die Young" as one of the "barely distinguishable slowies", and Priya Elan of the same publication wrote that the song is spoilt by "some rather drippy lyrics and [its] chorus", adding that there are several lyrical references that "instead of being explained further, are overturned in favour of some romantic mulch". Greg Kot of the Chicago Tribune noted that the song was a little more than a chorus on repeat. Ryan Dombal of Pitchfork Media commented that "Rather Die Young" ruins its Philly soul vibe with "a theatrical Broadway glaze".

== Live performances ==
Beyoncé performed "Rather Die Young" live for first time on August 14, 2011 during the 4 Intimate Nights with Beyoncé revue, which was held at the Roseland Ballroom, in New York City. She performed the ballad in front of 3,500 people; she was wearing a gold dress and was backed by her all-female band and her backing singers, called the Mamas. The performance was included on her 2011 video album Live at Roseland: Elements of 4. The song was also included on a medley with "Love on Top" on the Renaissance World Tour (2023).

== Chart performance ==
Selling 15,161 digital downloads, "Rather Die Young" opened at number 37 on the South Korea Gaon International Singles Chart for the week ending July 2, 2011.

Chart (2011)	Peak position
South Korea Gaon International Singles Chart	37
