= Mute challenge =

Concert phenomenon

The mute challenge or "Everybody on Mute" challenge is a concert phenomenon and social media challenge, in which the audience collectively goes silent at a specific moment during a live performance. First popularized by Beyoncé's Renaissance World Tour (2023), the challenge has spread on social media and gained popularity amongst artists and fans. The challenge sparked commentary on audience participation and concert etiquette.

== Format ==
The mute challenge typically occurs at a pre-determined part of a song, where the artist or the lyrics cue the audience to go quiet. The silence usually lasts a few seconds and is followed by an enthusiastic return to noise, with cheering, music, or lyrics. Success in the challenge is often measured by how silent and disciplined the crowd can remain.

== History ==
=== Conception ===
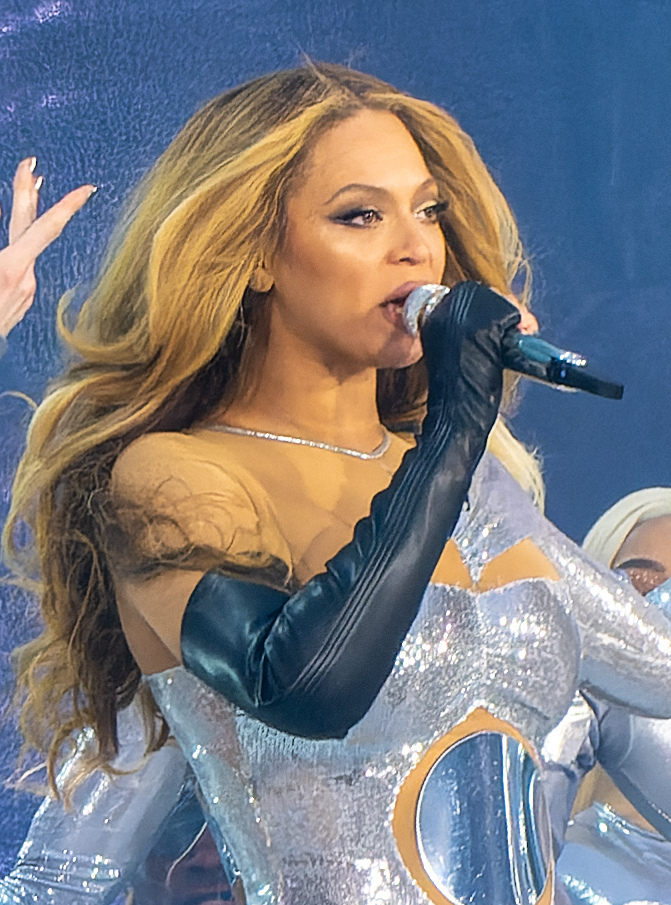
The mute challenge was conceived during Beyoncé's Renaissance World Tour (2023).

The mute challenge was first used in Beyoncé's Renaissance World Tour (2023). During the performance of the song "Energy", after Beyoncé sings the line "Look around, everybody on mute", the music pauses for five seconds while she and her dancers freeze and put their fingers over their lips. As Beyoncé never explicitly asked the audience to go silent during this moment, fans were unaware of the need to be silent in earlier shows of the tour. Later in the tour, fans conceived a "mute challenge" where the audience must stay silent until Beyoncé continues with the next line: "Look around, it's me and my crew / Big energy."

As the tour progressed, the challenge started to spread on social media, with more fans participating in the silence. The challenge was turned into a competition between tour stops to see how quiet each city's audience could be. Over time, the challenge went viral and hundreds of videos were shared on social media, with fans becoming increasingly competitive. Several celebrities posted videos of themselves participating in the mute challenge, including Lupita Nyong'o, Zendaya, Tom Holland, Nicole Richie, Vanessa Bryant, Tracee Ellis Ross, and Cardi B.

Beyoncé first acknowledged the challenge on August 6, 2023, by posting a message on her website crowning that night's audience in Washington D.C. the winner. During the show in Atlanta on August 11, 2023, Beyoncé declared the audience as winners of the challenge, exclaiming "Y’all won, y’all won, y’all won!" after finishing her line. On September 24, 2023, she crowned the Houston audience as the winners, saying "Y'all won that one".

Numerous attempts at the mute challenge drew attention on social media. Some fans started giving out cards with instructions at concerts, including in Rutherford and Kansas City. In Houston, after a man screamed "Woo!" during the moment of silence, he was smacked by a woman nearby who added, "Shut the fuck up!" After one concertgoer posted a video of herself shouting during the mute challenge, she faced backlash and was "trolled" by fans and was suspended from Twitter, although the reason for suspension was unclear. One fan went into labor during the mute challenge in Los Angeles.

=== Proliferation ===
Following its rise to popularity, the mute challenge has been used by other artists and performers, such as Taylor Swift and Megan Thee Stallion. Adele practised the mute challenge during her Weekends With Adele residency in 2023; after the audience did not fall silent, Adele joked: "You fucking failed miserably. When I sing 'everybody on mute,' you have to be fucking quiet." Moviegoers attending screenings of Renaissance: A Film by Beyoncé participated in the challenge during the "Energy" section of the movie. The challenge was also used in Olivia Rodrigo's Guts World Tour (2024–2025). During the opener "Bad Idea, Right?", after Rodrigo sings "Now I'm gettin' in the car, wreckin' all my plans/ I know I should stop", the audience stays silent until she continues with the next line: "But I can't." During Madison Beer's The Spinnin Tour (2024), a mute challenge took place during "Silence Between Songs". Another mute challenge took place during Beyoncé's Cowboy Carter Tour (2025), with the audience falling silent after the lyrics "Now wait" during "Single Ladies (Put a Ring on It)". The original "Energy" mute challenge was also performed during night 2, 3 and 4 in London during the Cowboy Carter Tour, as well as the final show in Las Vegas, which saw Destiny's Child reunite to lead the challenge. American rapper Cardi B performed a mute challenge in her Little Miss Drama Tour (2026) during "Pretty & Petty", in which she asks the audience to name five Bia songs as an apparent diss to the rapper. A mute challenge was introduced on Ariana Grande's Eternal Sunshine Tour (2026), occurring after she sings the lyric "Me and my truth, we sit in silence" during "We Can't Be Friends (Wait for Your Love)".

The format has also inspired parodies and adaptations in other entertainment spaces and digital media, and teachers have used the challenge to silence classrooms.

== Analysis and reception ==
The mute challenge has been widely praised as an innovative form of audience participation in live concerts, signifying the power of fan-artist connection. It also sparked broader commentary on fan culture, concert etiquette, and the evolving role of the audience in performance art.

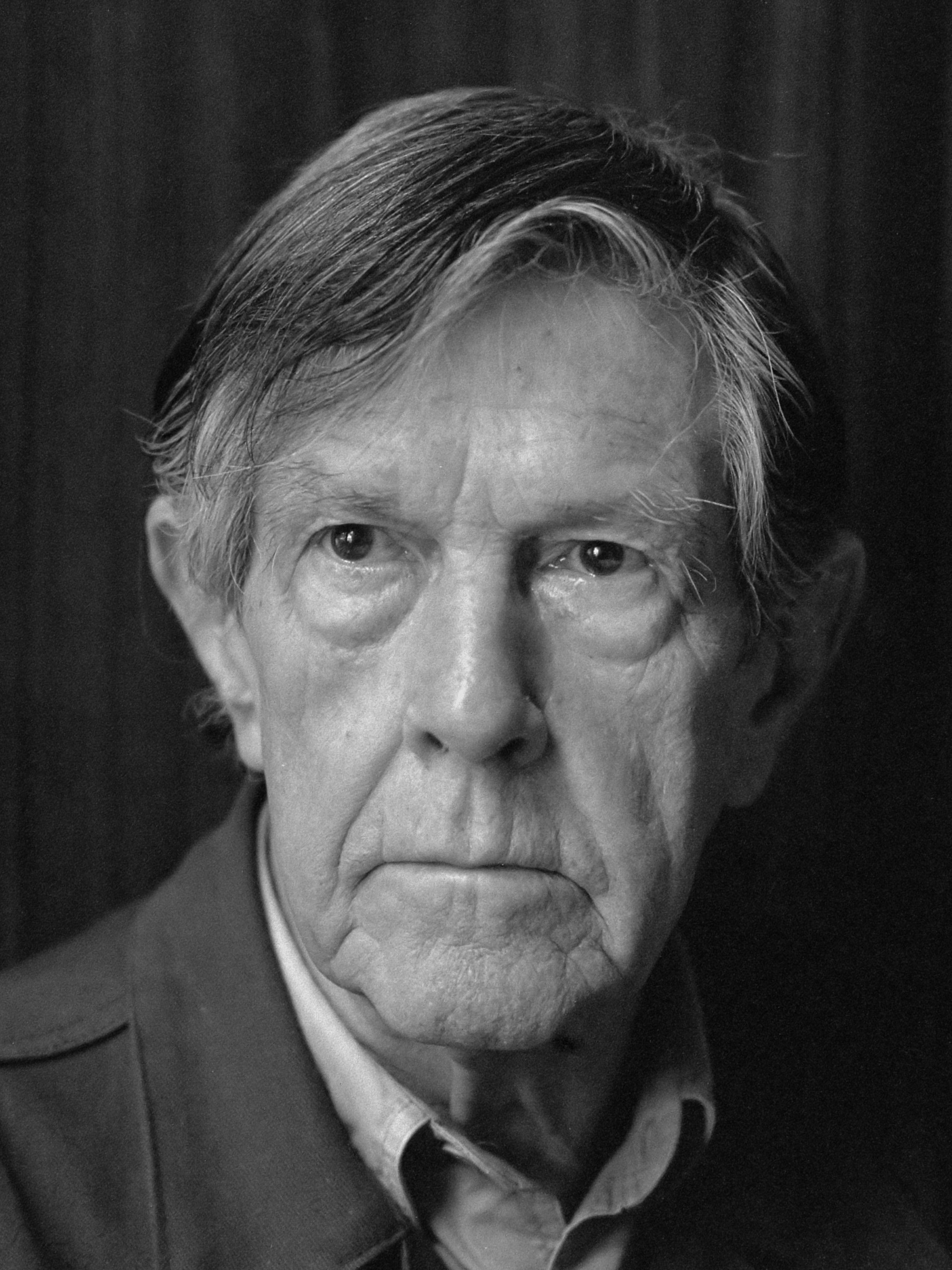
The mute challenge has been compared to John Cage's silent composition 4'33"

In Music, Sound, and the Moving Image, Carlo Cenciarelli explained that the mute challenge makes a spectacle of the audience's own discipline and participation, acknowledging "its ability to act as one body shaped by the same 'intentional object'". Cenciarelli wrote that the mute challenge, alongside the movie A Quiet Place (2018) and the use of breaks and drops in EDM, highlight "the broader role that spectacular silence is gaining in negotiating the meanings of media experiences". Neal Stulberg, conductor of the UCLA Symphony Orchestra, drew parallels between the mute challenge and John Cage's silent composition 4'33", in which ambient sounds become a part of the musical experience and music is utilized to play with the manipulation of time. In a paper by Solomon Mike, the author characterizes the mute challenge as a contemporary example of prosumption, whereby the audience participates in the phenomenon together with the performer, both in the digital and physical realms.

Catherine Provenzano, UCLA assistant professor of musicology, explained that while a lot of live performances in pop music are trying to re-create the experience of listening to the album, the mute challenge highlights the beauty and unpredictability of live performance, with participants needing to be attending a concert with a community of fellow fans in order to experience it. Stig Edgren, producer and designer of major concerts, said that the mute challenge is a testament to the performer's control over their audiences, noting that "it's so hard to coordinate and get that many people in a stadium to be quiet for that many seconds" especially without an explicit announcement or countdown.

While the Renaissance World Tour's stop in Seattle on September 14, 2023 caused a substantial increase in seismic activity, as measured by the Pacific Northwest Seismic Network, both high and low seismic frequencies paused during the mute challenge, indicating silence from both the music and crowd motion.
