= Blow My Mind (Robyn song) =

2002 promotional single by Robyn

Promotional single by Robyn

from the album Don't Stop the Music
- Released: 2002
- Genre: Electroclash; electronic pop
- Length: 4:06
- Label: BMG Sweden
- Songwriters: Alexander Kronlund; Robyn
- Producer: Guy Sigsworth

"Blow My Mind" is a song by Swedish singer Robyn from her third studio album Don't Stop the Music (2002). Written by Alexander Kronlund and Robyn and produced by Guy Sigsworth, it is a synth-driven song with vocal effects and a prominent guitar solo. Drawing inspiration from multiple acts and genres, "Blow My Mind" is primarily an electroclash and electronic pop song. It was issued as a promotional CD single by BMG Sweden and distributed to Swedish radio stations in 2002.

"Blow My Mind" received generally positive reviews from music critics, many of whom regarded it as one of the focal points on Don't Stop the Music. The song briefly entered the Svensktoppen radio chart at number ten. Robyn performed "Blow My Mind" on tour in 2003 and 2005, and premiered a reworked version live in concert 20 years later in November 2025. The re-recording is included on her ninth studio album Sexistential (2026).

== Background and release ==
After plans to release her second studio album My Truth (1999) outside of Sweden were dropped, Robyn left her international deal with RCA and BMG. She later signed a new international contract with Jive in 2001, while remaining with BMG in Sweden, and began working on her third album Don't Stop the Music (2002). She sought to make a more straightforward record than her previous studio efforts, wanting to keep production "direct and simple". She departed from her previous R&B influences in favor of a "tougher, harder" pop sound, and stated that the most difficult part of the process was balancing commercial appeal and credibility.

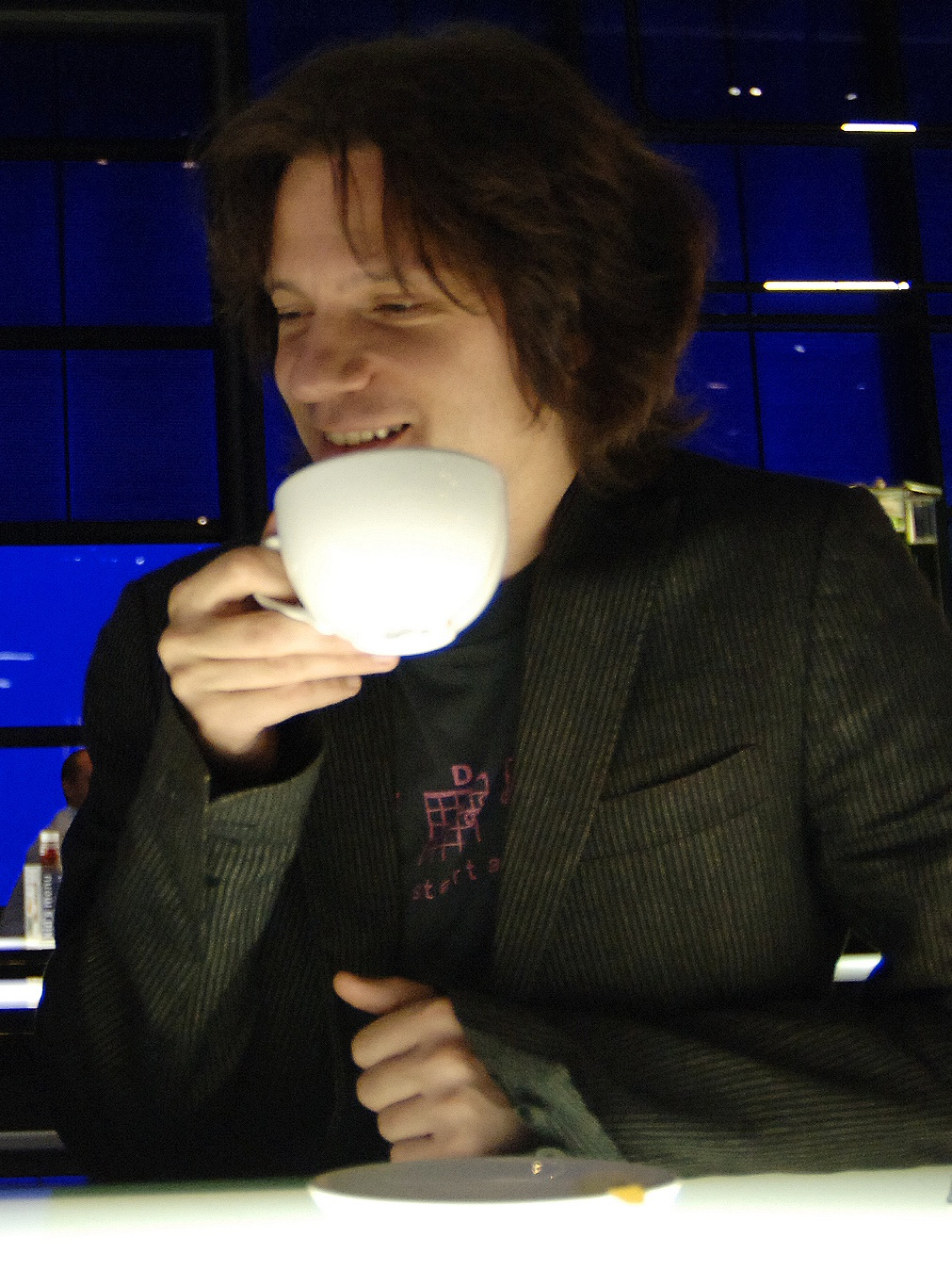
Guy Sigsworth produced "Blow My Mind".

Robyn co-wrote songs with collaborators more extensively for Don't Stop the Music than on her previous albums as it allowed her to be challenged and create something new. She primarily worked with Johan Ekhé and Ulf Lindström, collectively known as Ghost, in addition to Remee and Alexander Kronlund. Inspired by "funky 80s music" such as Chaka Khan and Prince, she co-wrote four album tracks with Kronlund, including "Blow My Mind". Guy Sigsworth produced the song and "Should Have Known", another collaboration with Kronlund. Sean McGhee recorded Robyn's vocals for "Blow My Mind" and handled mixing with Damian Taylor. After working together, Robyn introduced Sigsworth to Max Martin, who was impressed with the songs he had produced for her. Martin later suggested that Sigsworth work with Britney Spears, resulting in the production of "Everytime" (2003).

BMG Sweden issued "Blow My Mind" as a promotional CD single and sent it to Swedish radio stations in 2002. On 31 August 2003, it bubbled under the ten positions on Svensktoppen, a chart compiled by Sveriges Radio and ranked by jury votes. The next week it entered the chart at number ten, before falling off thereafter. The song was included in the set list for Robyn's 2003 Sweden summer tour, where it was performed after the opening number "Breakdown Intermission". She embarked on a club tour later in the fall with an altered set list, performing "Blow My Mind" in the middle of the show. While the tour was in progress, Robyn told Nerikes Allehanda that the song was the most fun to perform. She later performed the song live while touring in 2005 for her fourth studio album Robyn.

== Composition ==
Music critics labeled "Blow My Mind" an electroclash and electronic pop song with instrumentation primarily provided by guitar and synthesizer. It lasts for four minutes and six seconds and includes an Edge-esque guitar solo midway through. Sigsworth played all instruments. Robyn's vocals, edited by McGhee, are treated with electronic effects. Substitute Thapliyal, writing for Paste, described "Blow My Mind" as a "beep-bloop ballad" and a predecessor to the singer's "fembot antics later in the decade". Several commentators observed influences of multiple sources in "Blow My Mind", including disco and soul genres. Resumé critic Bobby Svensson noted features of bubblegum pop and characterized the song as a combination of Aqua's "Barbie Girl" (1997) and All Saints' "Pure Shores" (2000). Other critics recognized inspiration from works by Dot Allison, Kent, Kylie Minogue, and Stina Nordenstam.

== Critical reception ==
"Blow My Mind" was generally well received by music critics, several of whom regarded it as one of strongest moments on Don't Stop the Music. Among them were Borås Tidning's Magnus Persson, Helsingborgs Dagblad's Patrik Andersson, and Västerbottens Folkblad's Olov Baudin, as well as Svensson from Resumé, who praised the song's composition and musical influences. Kicki Norman of Aftonbladet called it "wonderful", writing that the track alone justified the album's price. Alexander Elb from Norrköpings Tidningar enjoyed the pop songs of the album, including "Blow My Mind", which they called an "unashamed flirtation" with the 1980s. Mattias Dahlström of Dagens Nyheter viewed the album as largely designed for commercial appeal, but commended "Blow My Mind", calling it one of two tracks on which Robyn broke the mold. Edward Cheung of PopMatters opnied that the track and the album cut "Should Have Known" were "examples of edgy electronic pop", but concluded that the latter was "slightly" superior.

Tony Ernst of Göteborgs-Posten felt that its musical influence contributed to what they described as the album's "confusing" sound, labeling "Blow My Mind" an "almost eerie carbon copy" of Nordenstam's work. Writing for TT Spektra, Malin Dahlberg identified the song as the sole outlier on an album aimed at commercial success. Defining it as a cross between the catalogues of Minogue and Kent, Dahlberg concluded that it failed to take advantage of Robyn's vocal abilities, which they called a "big miss". A writer from Nerikes Allehanda gave a critical assessment of "Blow My Mind" and used it as an example of Don't Stop the Music lacking substance. The writer asserted, "'Blow My Mind' sounds exactly like what I have been secretly terrified people who like Primal Scream and the Stone Roses would sound like if they were allowed to make their own music."

== 2026 rework ==
"Blow My Mind"

Single by Robyn

from the album Sexistential
- Released: 11 March 2026
- Genre: Electro-funk
- Length: 2:57
- Label: Konichiwa; Young
- Songwriters: Alexander Kronlund; Klas Åhlund; Robyn
- Producer: Klas Åhlund

Robyn singles chronology
"Sexistential" / "Talk to Me" (2026)	"Blow My Mind" (2026)

In November 2025, Robyn premiered a reworked version of "Blow My Mind" during a one-off concert hosted by Spotify and Acne Studios at the Fonda Theatre in Los Angeles. The performance marked her first time performing the song in 20 years. The re-recording was later revealed to be included on the track listing for her ninth studio album Sexistential (2026). It marked the third track from Don't Stop the Music to be repurposed for a subsequent studio release. (Note: "Should Have Known" was re-recorded in 2005 for the standard track listing of Robyn, while "Keep This Fire Burning" was reworked in 2008 and included on the UK special edition of Robyn.)

The reworked version of "Blow My Mind" contains new lyrics written by Robyn about her son. In a press release, she stated: "Listening back to the original I thought, 'I think it's one of the best songs I ever recorded, and I'm just gonna do it again.' I rewrote the lyrics and I love this version's rawness." Klas Åhlund received composer credit and also served as producer.

Robyn released a remix to the song featuring Ca7riel & Paco Amoroso on 29 April 2026.

== Credits and personnel ==
=== Original version ===
Credits are adapted from the liner notes of Don't Stop the Music.

Studios

- Mastered at the Cutting Room (Stockholm)

Personnel

- Robyn – songwriting
- Björn Engelmann – mastering
- Alexander Kronlund – songwriting
- Sean McGhee – editing, mixing, recording
- Guy Sigsworth – instruments, production
- Damian Taylor – mixing

=== Sexistential version ===
Credits are adapted from Tidal.

- Robyn – composition, lyrics, vocals
- Niklas Flyckt – mixing
- Chris Gehringer – mastering
- Alexander Kronlund – composition
- Klas Åhlund – composition, engineering, production, programming

== Charts ==
Weekly chart performance
Chart (2003)	Peak position
Sweden (Svensktoppen)	10

Weekly chart performance
Chart (2026)	Peak position
Sweden Heatseeker (Sverigetopplistan)	15
Sweden Airplay (Radiomonitor)	69
