= Renaissance World Tour =

2023 concert tour by Beyoncé

- Tour by Beyoncé
- Promotional poster
- Location: Europe; North America
- Associated album: Renaissance
- Start date: May 10, 2023
- End date: October 1, 2023
- No. of shows: 56
- Attendance: 2.78 million
- Box office: $579.8 million (Note: $612.67 million in 2025 dollars.)

Beyoncé concert chronology
- On the Run II Tour (2018); Renaissance World Tour (2023); Cowboy Carter Tour (2025)

The Renaissance World Tour was the sixth concert tour by American singer-songwriter Beyoncé. Her highest-grossing tour to date, it was staged in support of her seventh studio album, Renaissance (2022). The tour comprised fifty-six shows, beginning on May 10, 2023, in Stockholm, Sweden, and concluding on October 1, 2023, in Kansas City, Missouri. It was Beyoncé's first tour since the On the Run II Tour in 2018 and was her fourth all-stadium tour overall.

The concerts lasted between two and a half and three hours and were split into six or seven acts, with Beyoncé performing the tracks from Renaissance in order, interspersed with songs from across her discography. The stage consisted of a giant screen with a large “portal” in its center, and featured sculptures, robotic arms and ultraviolet technology.

According to official figures provided by Billboard Boxscore, the tour broke ticket sales records worldwide in 2023, becoming both the seventh-highest-grossing concert tour of all time and the highest-grossing tour by a black woman. It also achieved the three highest monthly tour grosses in history and ranked at number one on the Top Tours Year End 2023 list. The shows received critical acclaim, with particular praise for the production value and Beyoncé's vocal performances. The tour boosted both local and national economies and was a sociocultural phenomenon. Renaissance: A Film by Beyoncé, which chronicles the creation and execution of the tour, was released in cinemas on December 1, 2023.

== Background ==
The tour was teased on October 23, 2022, when Beyoncé auctioned a ticket for an unspecified show. It was sold for $50,000 in a charity auction at the Wearable Art Gala to support the WACO Theatre. It included two tickets to the concert, first-class airfare, a three-night hotel stay, and a personal backstage tour led by Beyoncé's mother. On February 1, 2023, Beyoncé announced the tour via her Instagram account.

In March 2023, Business leaders in western Sydney began advocating for Stadium Australia to take priority over the Sydney Football Stadium for a Beyoncé concert in New South Wales, due to the latter having twice the audience capacity to accommodate her ticket demand. The possibility of Stadium Australia securing a Renaissance World Tour concert has chiefly provoked the Government of New South Wales to end a 57-year ban on holding more than four concerts per year at the stadium. The ban could be lifted as soon as October 2023 to allow the venue to host Beyoncé in 2024. The Premier of New South Wales said that this could bring local businesses "an additional $1.3 billion." The concert cap has existed since 1965 due to noise complaints from nearby residents, but now the government is pushing to increase it to 20 concerts per year.

In April 2023, Beyoncé rented an indoor arena, Paris La Défense Arena, in Nanterre, to rehearse for the tour. She underwent knee surgery just a month before the rehearsals and was in rehab while the tour started. Khirye Tyler and Dammo Farmer are credited as the tour's music directors, with Damien Smith as head of the music production and Tiffany Moníque Ryan as Vocal Director. Producer Amorphous assisted with the show's musical arrangements, while composer Emily Bear was the featured pianist for the tour.

While the tour was not advertised with an official opening act, guest DJs occasionally performed sets before the start of the show, as well as rapper Doechii, in various cities. The selection was curated by the tour's creative director Andrew Makadsi, and was noted for its centering of figures from dance music and queer nightlife scenes.

== Ticket sales ==
Alongside the announcement of the tour, it was also announced that a public on-sale for the North American leg would initially not happen, with all initial ticket sales for the leg using Ticketmaster's Verified Fan system. In addition, all the cities in the North American leg of the tour would be split into three different registration groups that would all have different registration periods and on-sale times.

Jay Peters of The Verge noted that this spreading out of demand appeared to be an attempt by Ticketmaster to prevent an incident identical to the 2022 Ticketmaster fiasco of Taylor Swift's Eras Tour that had occurred less than three months earlier, in which the website crashed during the Verified Fan presale. Peters questioned how effective the strategy would be since people could sign up for each of the registration groups instead of just one. In light of the mismanagement of Swift's concert ticket sales, and the U.S. Senate hearing it sparked, the Senate Judiciary Committee tweeted from their official Twitter account, "We're watching, @Ticketmaster," in reference to the Renaissance World Tour ticketing.

In light of this, Ticketmaster has implemented new policies to try and combat difficulty for concertgoers and to "create a less crowded ticket shopping experience for fans". Registration does not guarantee a ticket. Instead, a "lottery-style process" affects who is placed on the waitlist and who is given a unique access code after registering as a Verified Fan. Tickets bought in European markets also cannot be resold on Ticketmaster for more than their original price.

=== Presale ===
The first pre-sale in the UK on February 2, which was exclusive for O2 customers, was met with "overwhelming" demand and caused the O2 Priority website to crash. Over 200,000 people were trying to purchase tickets for one of the London dates, of which fewer than 7,000 were available. After fans voiced their upset and caused "O2 Priority" to trend on Twitter, O2 released an apology acknowledging the "huge demand" and reassuring fans that they are working to resolve the issue.

A pre-sale on February 3, which was organized by Live Nation, saw over 3 million people trying to get tickets for dates in the UK, France, Sweden and Poland, which caused Ticketmaster to crash. In the first few minutes of the second UK pre-sale, over 400,000 people joined the queue to one of the London shows, which then extended to over 800,000 people. More than 600,000 people were in the queue for tickets to the Edinburgh show. In France, over 260,000 people were trying to purchase tickets for the Paris show.

=== General sale ===
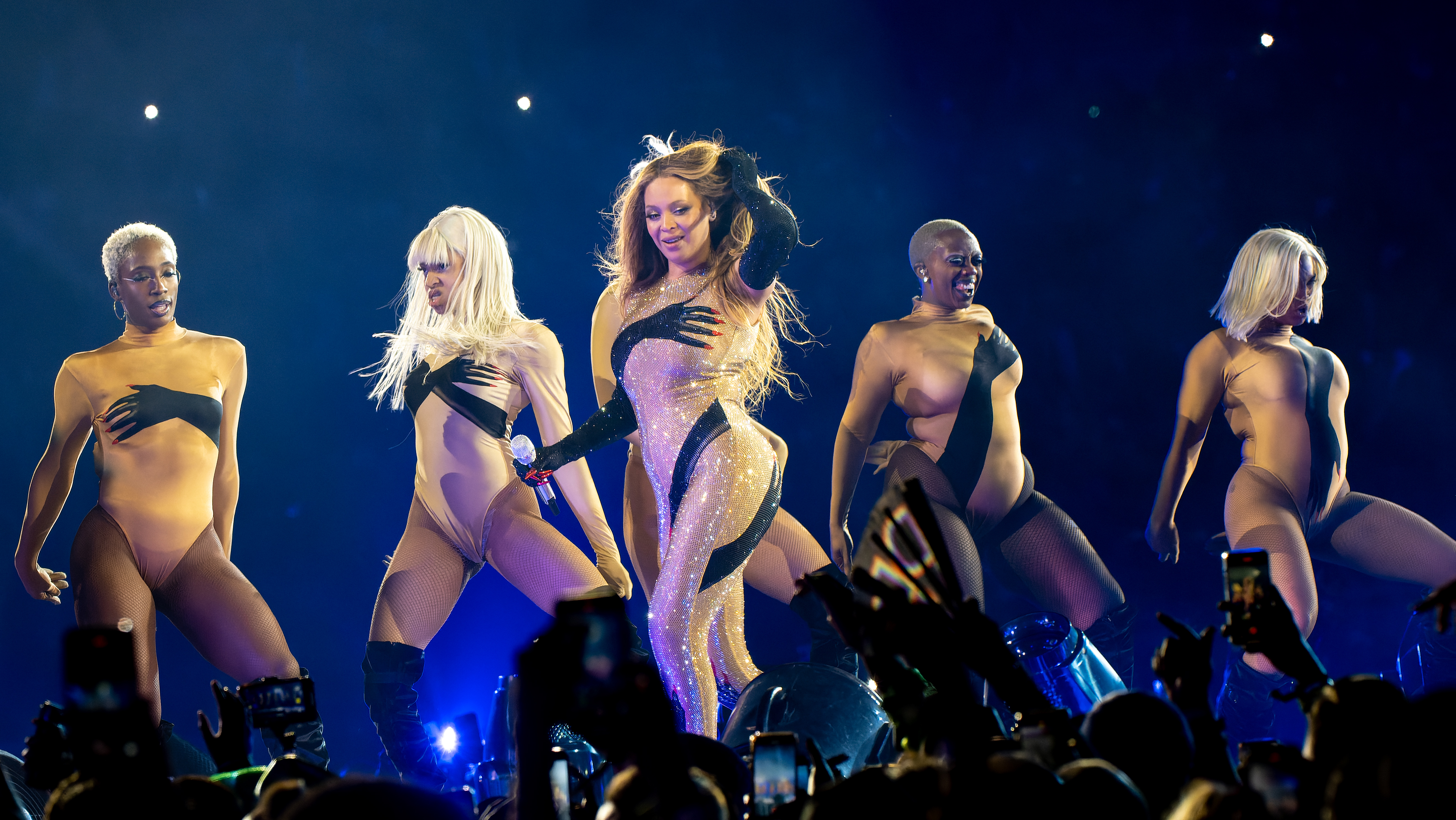
Beyoncé performing "MOVE" during her concert at Tottenham Hotspur Stadium

Millions of people were trying to get tickets upon general sale in the UK, causing the Ticketmaster site to crash due to the "incredible" demand. After more than 370,000 people queued for each of the two London dates, a third date was added. The third London date saw half a million people queuing for tickets, leading to a fourth date being added. The fourth date saw another half a million people joining the queue, leading to a fifth date being added.

Beyoncé's shows in Paris and Marseille sold out within minutes, with hundreds of thousands of fans trying to buy tickets and the Stade de France site crashing. Martin d'Argenlieu of Stade Vélodrome said that they had not seen such demand for a decade. Additional shows were added in Amsterdam, Stockholm, and Warsaw due to high demand for the first shows announced in those cities. Financial Times reported that economists at Danske Bank believe that Beyoncé's decision to start her world tour in Stockholm led to a surge in local hotel prices that resulted in inflation in Sweden exceeding expectations, further calling it "astonishing for a single event".

According to Ticketmaster, the ticket demand exceeded the number of available tickets by more than 800% in Toronto, Chicago, East Rutherford, Landover, Atlanta, Inglewood, and Houston, to all of which additional shows were added consequently. Live Nation said that, despite the newly added dates, the majority of fans will not be able to purchase tickets: "Demand drastically exceeds supply".

== Production ==
=== Staging and lighting ===
The tour was planned in the lapse of four years and three identical stages for the show were developed, with one stage being set up in a city while the other two travelled to be constructed in the following destinations. The design process took eighteen months and was held in charge by Es Devlin Studio and Stufish Entertainment Architects, along with Beyoncé and her creative team, Parkwood. The staging consists of two separate platforms connected by a broad ramp: the A stage with a circle shaped cavity in the middle of a giant, flat screen; while the B stage is subdivided in a circumferenced structure surrounding the so-called VIP section "Club Renaissance", with an extension of the ramp acting as the radius of the layout. It also features monumental sculptures and metallic tanks, mannequin-horses, robotic arms, pyrotechnics and ultraviolet technology. Beyoncé was treated for bronchitis and had nearly continual sinus infections as a result of excess inhalation of the various smoke effects on stage.

=== Costume design ===
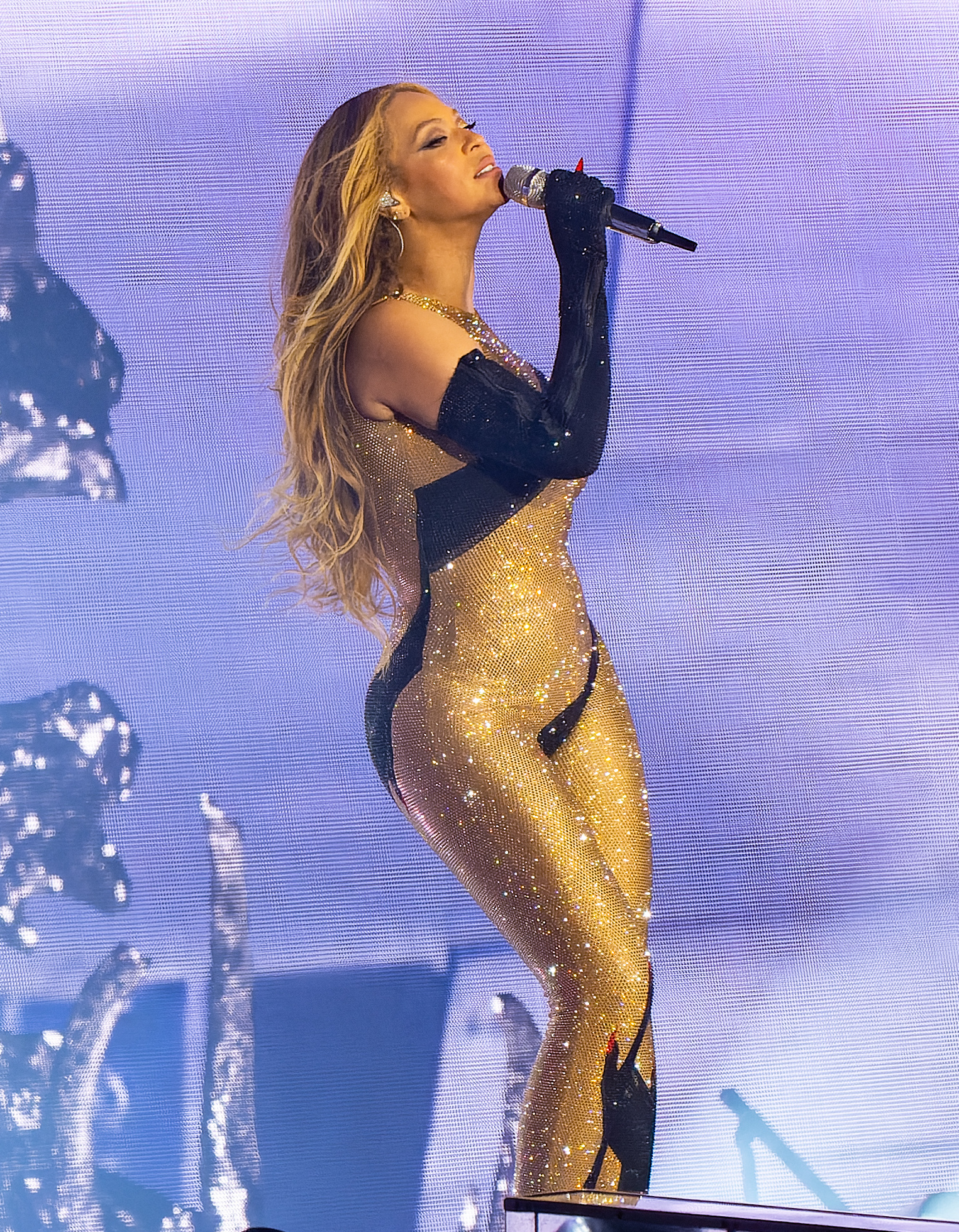
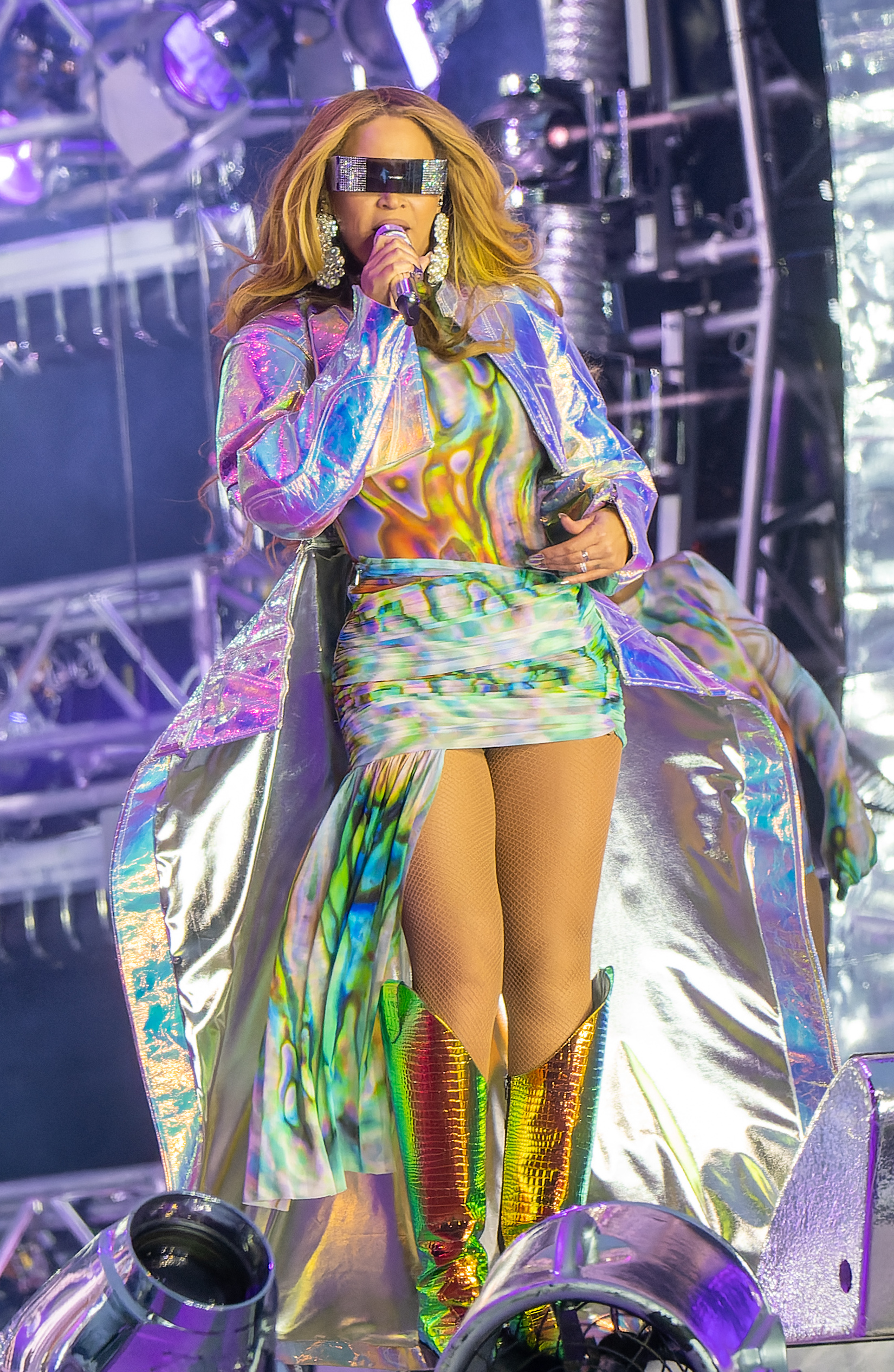
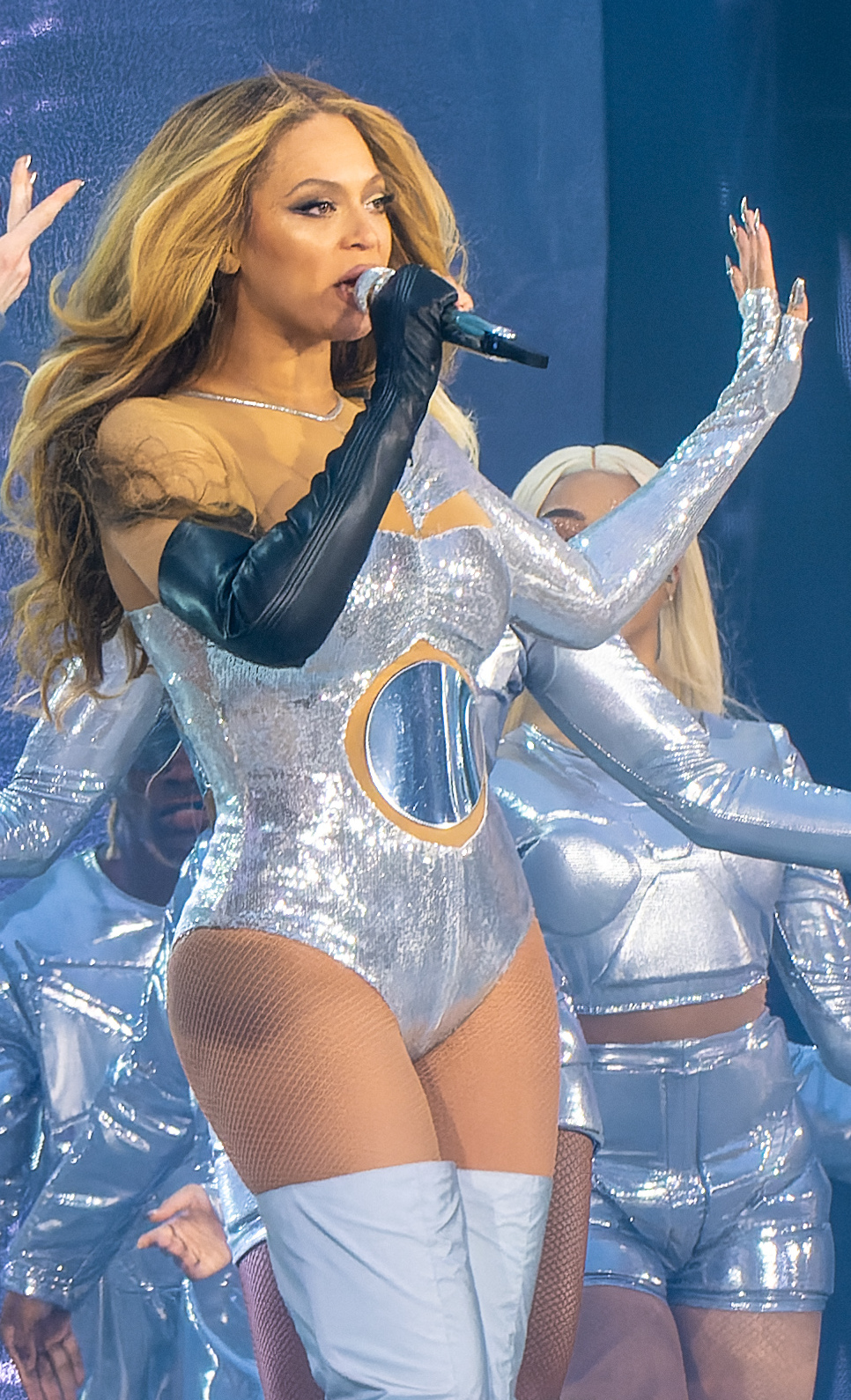
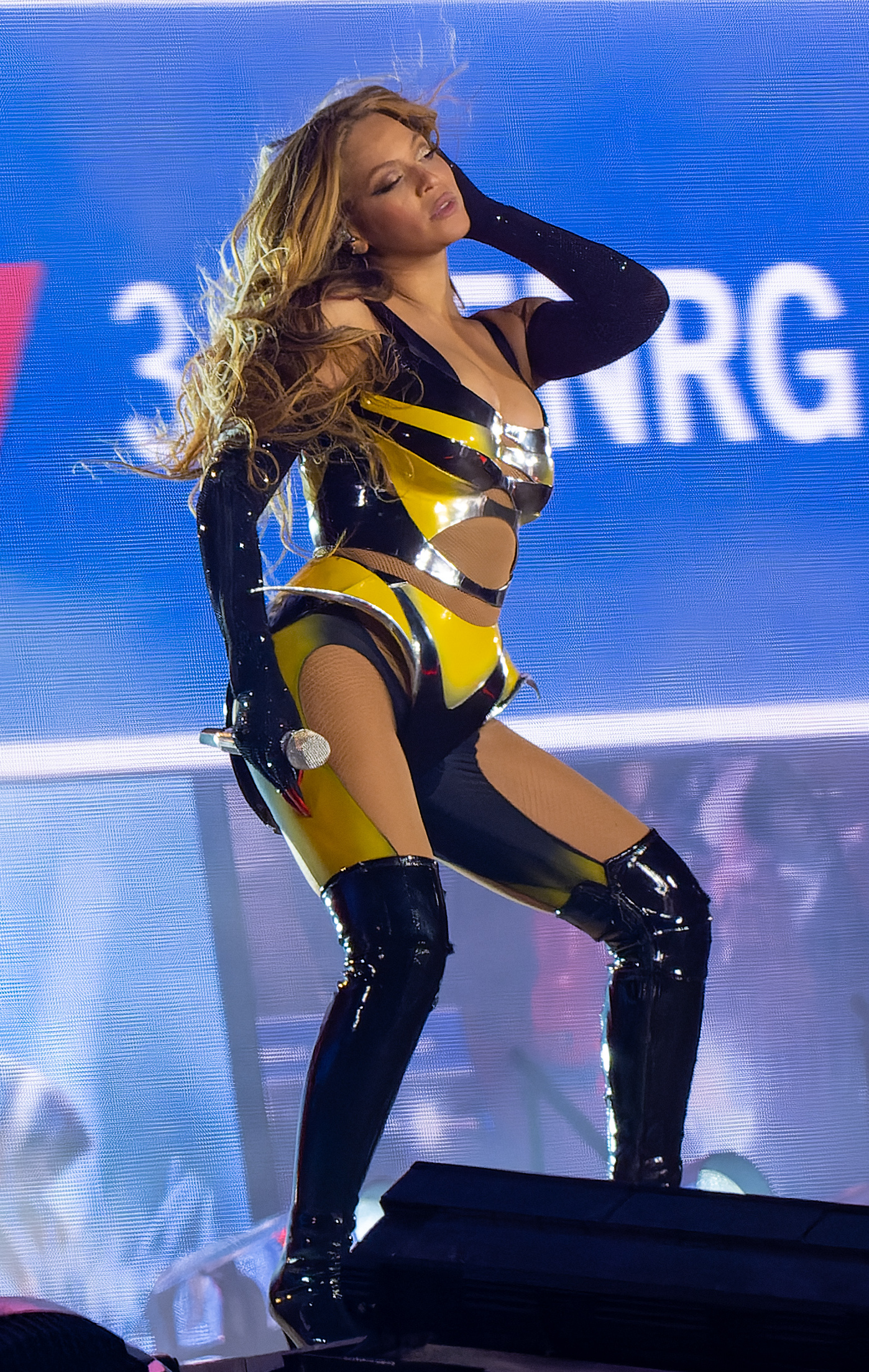
Costumes included, clockwise from top left, Loewe, David Koma, Mugler by Casey Cadwallader, and Courrèges.

Beyoncé had multiple outfit changes throughout the show, under the styling of Shiona Turini. Every concert featured anywhere between 1 and 8 new outfits debuted.

The wardrobe features a silver beaded Alexander McQueen catsuit, a white bell-sleeved Anrealage gown that transformed into a multicolored masterpiece underneath a UV light, a custom silver Courrèges bodysuit with a striking circular cutout, a pearl-embellished Balmain bodysuit, hat and sunglasses, a metallic feathered frock courtesy of Coperni, a colorful mesh minidress by David Koma, a bejeweled Loewe bodysuit, and a bee costume by Thierry Mugler. Additional accessories and jewelry were custom-made by Tiffany & Co. Among the collection of designer pieces, MYKITA sunglasses are also part of the variety of ensembles showcased in the show.

Beyoncé wore 148 costumes over the tour's run, many of which honored local designers at each stop of the tour, including Jacquemus in Marseille, Robert Wun and Stella McCartney in London, Iris van Herpen in Amsterdam, and a Fendi design inspired by the artist Antonio Lopez in Barcelona. For the June 18 show in Amsterdam, Beyoncé celebrated the Juneteenth holiday by wearing exclusively Black designers, including Feben, Maximilian Davis for Ferragamo, Olivier Rousteing for Balmain, Ib Kamara for Off-White, LaQuan Smith, and her own Ivy Park collection.

== Concert synopsis ==
The show lasts between two and a half and three hours. It is structured into six distinct acts in which Beyoncé performs most songs from Renaissance in the album order, interspersed with songs from throughout her catalog. As the audience enters the stadium, the screen showcases an image inspired by the SMPTE color bars with additional bars that, as a whole, represent the Progress Pride Flag.

The Opening Act is performed by Beyoncé herself, in which she sings R&B ballads from earlier in her discography. Pink clouds are shown on the screen as an image of a glitching signboard rises, forming a picture of Beyoncé in a pose similar to Giorgione's Sleeping Venus. The singer rises onto the main stage to perform "Dangerously in Love 2" and welcomes the audience. "Flaws and All" and "1+1" continue the set before covers of Rose Royce's "I'm Going Down" and Tina Turner's "River Deep – Mountain High". The Opening Act ends with a performance of "I Care".

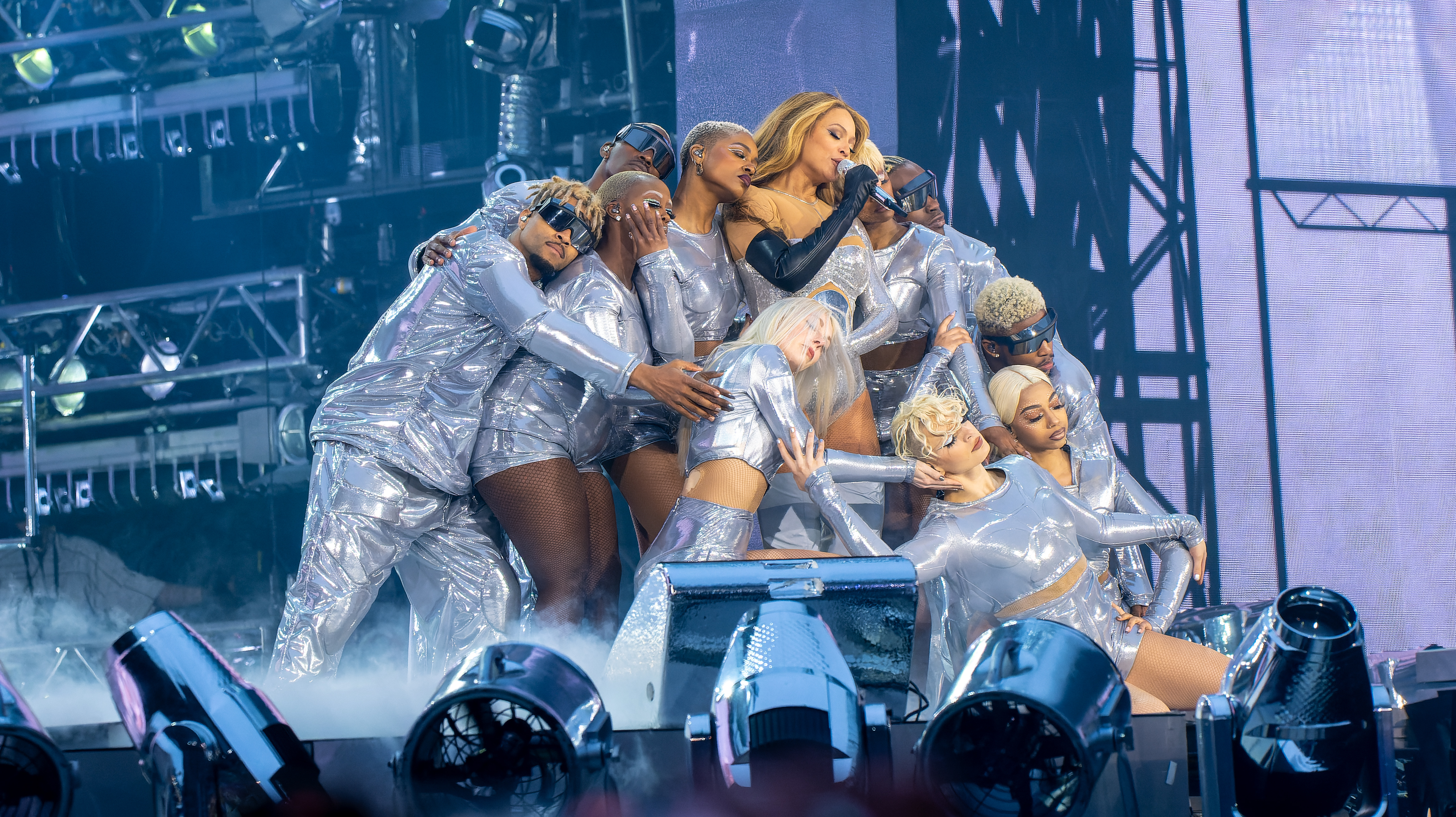
Beyoncé performing "I'm That Girl"

A visual interlude marks the next act as Renaissance, showing a maximalist montage of intergalactic travel and robotic machines reminiscent of Fritz Lang's 1927 sci-fi film Metropolis. This robot-themed segment of the show is interspersed with spoken word interludes from legendary commentator Kevin Jz Prodigy in an homage to ball culture. As the voice asks if the audience is 'ready to serve' and 'ready to slay', Beyoncé performs the first track from Renaissance, "I'm That Girl". Beyoncé then performs "Cozy" with two mechanical arms holding silver frames interacting with her as she dances. She then performs "Alien Superstar", with elements of "Sweet Dreams", followed by "Lift Off". The French dance duo Les Twins perform a dance break to "7/11".

The party-themed Motherboard act starts with "Cuff It" and its remix inside the dome. Making their way to the circular secondary stage, Beyoncé and her dancers then perform "Energy". The audience participates in a fan-made challenge in which they must go silent for a few seconds when Beyoncé sings the lyric "look around, everybody on mute"; each stop competes for who stays the most silent as part of a "mute challenge". A massive, inflatable disco horse prop is wheeled out of the dome and onto the stage in preparation for "Break My Soul", where Beyoncé and the dancers make their way around the perimeter of the B-Stage.

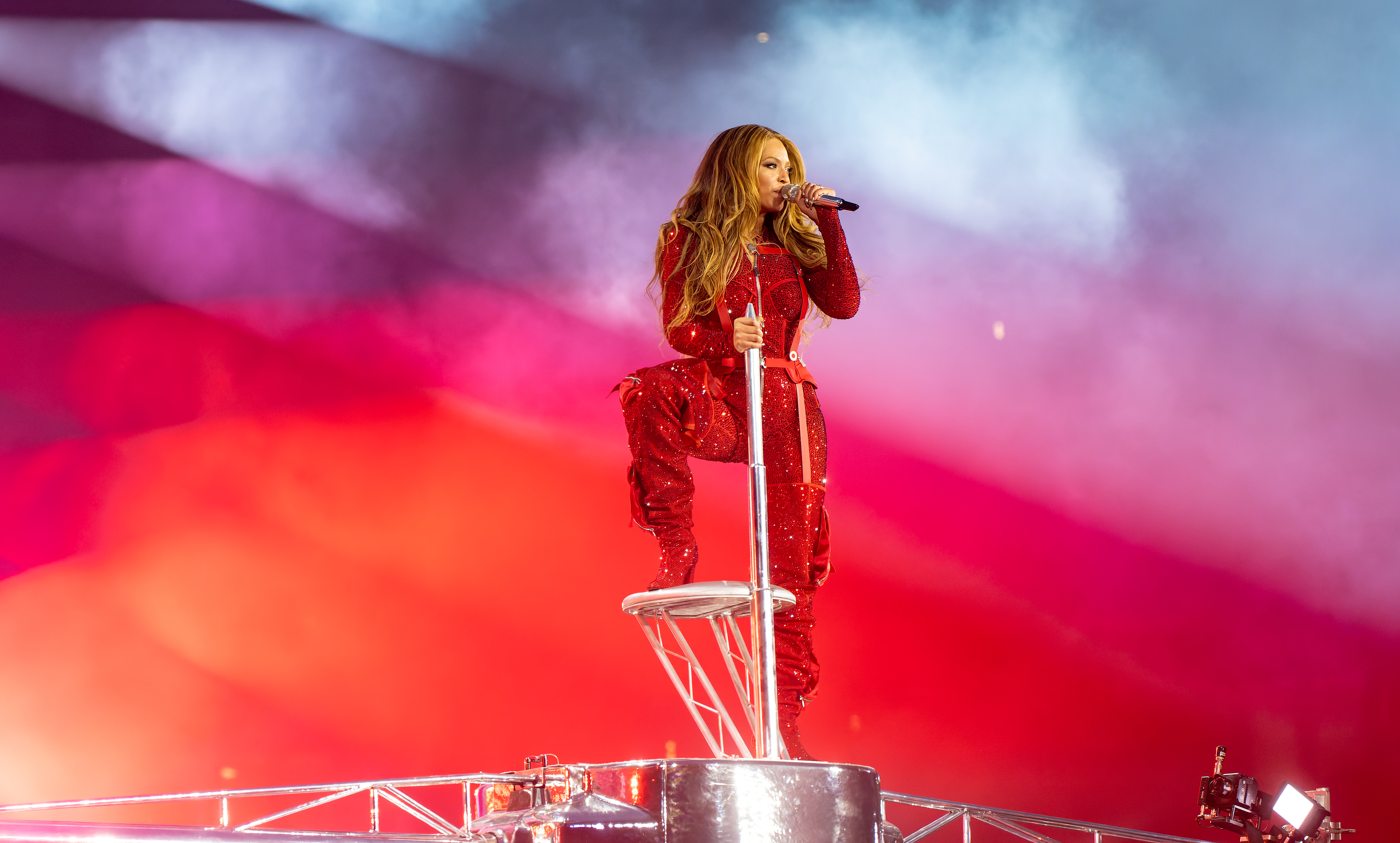
Beyoncé on the silver war tank

The next act, Opulence, has an army theme. This section begins with "Formation", which is followed by "Diva", making reference to rapper Lil Uzi Vert's viral dance on TikTok, and "Run the World (Girls)" on the ramp of the B-stage. She then performs "My Power" and exits the stage, only to reappear on top of a silver war tank to perform "Black Parade". Remaining on the tank, she then performs "Savage (Remix)" and "Partition", after which the tank drives off stage, closing the section. Beginning with the May 26, 2023, Paris show, Blue Ivy began joining Beyoncé onstage to perform choreography to "My Power" and "Black Parade".

Following an interlude opening the church-themed Anointed section, Beyoncé emerges from the dome in all-white robe that is struck by ultraviolet light to reveal a colorful pattern evocative of stained glass, which is then removed for a performance of "Church Girl", "Get Me Bodied" and "Before I Let Go". Backing vocalists and dancers appear on stage to accompany "Rather Die Young". Beyoncé begins to perform "Love on Top", singing the final two key changes a cappella alongside the audience, before counting into "Crazy in Love", during which the dancers are dressed in white tank tops and denim jeans, recreating Beyoncé's outfit from the music video.

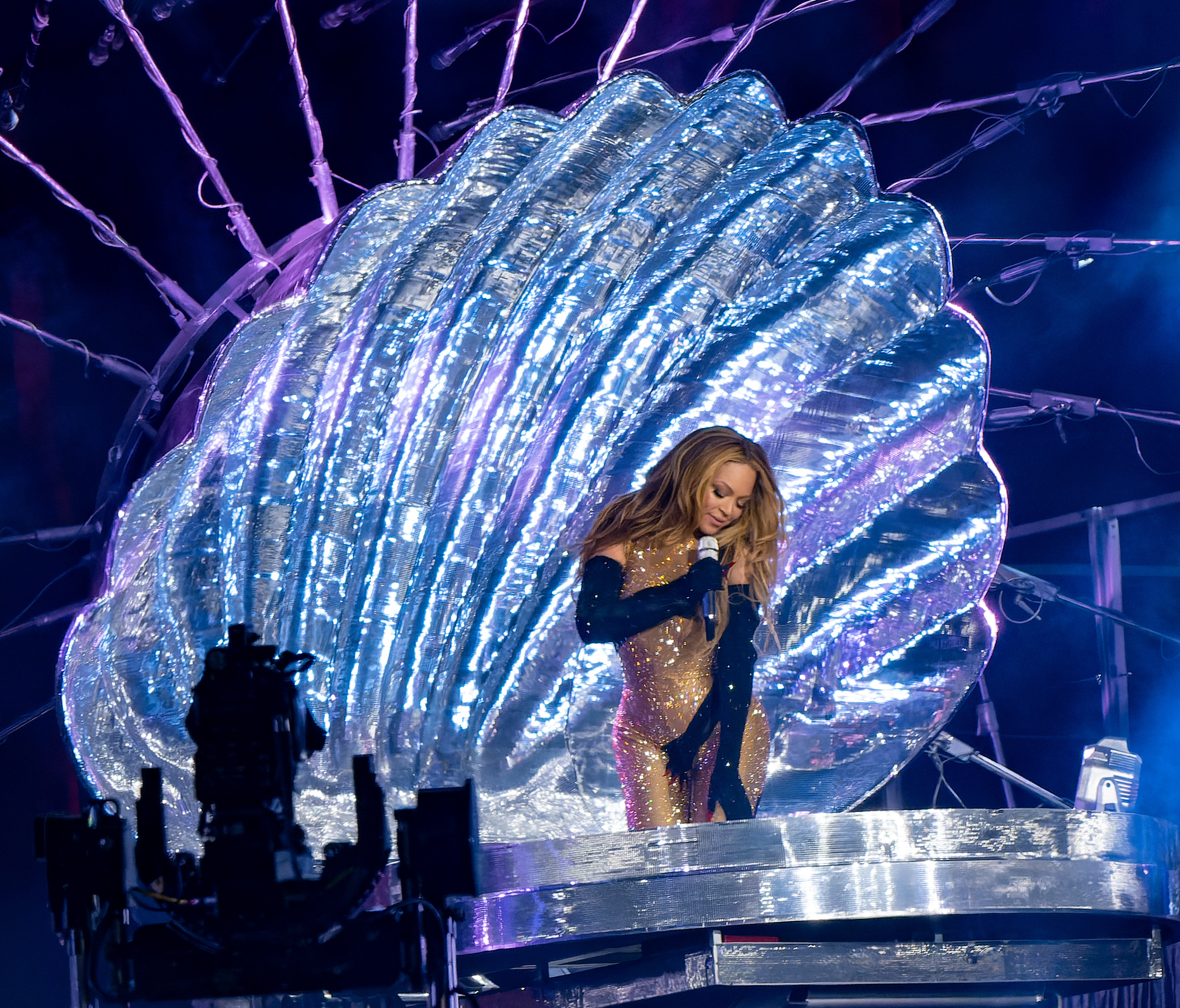
Beyoncé inside a clam shell performing "Virgo's Groove"

After her background vocalists, Pure Honey, perform Diana Ross' "Love Hangover" as an interlude, Beyoncé returns to perform an undersea-themed act. This section features an oversized disco ball prop suspended above the crowd. Beyoncé is revealed inside a clam shell, reminiscent of Botticelli’s The Birth of Venus, in a bedazzled "hands-on" Loewe bodysuit. She performs "Plastic off the Sofa" and a mash-up of "Virgo's Groove" with "Naughty Girl", during which Beyoncé also includes snippets of a number of her R&B songs, including "Say My Name" and "Dance for You". "Move" is performed on the B-stage with choreography along with her dancers. During "Heated", the robotic arms return to holding fans, as does Beyoncé, fanning herself off while standing in a circle of microphones. The performance is accompanied by pyrotechnic columns. In many performances, Beyoncé runs down the runway to the B-Stage while singing the outro to the song. She then exits the stage as Les Twins then perform a dance break to "Already".

On select dates, Beyoncé performed the Memories Run Through My Wires act, a special provocateur-themed section. It is composed of "Thique", "All Up in Your Mind", and "Drunk in Love". The "Thique" performance is accompanied by a huge inflatable breasts prop and a dance performed along a set of horizontal metal railings, containing a "Toxic" sample as a shoutout to Britney Spears. The "All up in Your Mind" performance features a chair dance and the "Drunk in Love" performance includes fireworks and seductive pole dancing, and ends with Beyoncé being lifted above the B-stage on a motorized tower, reminiscent of her controversial, viral performance in Dubai earlier on January 21. This act was performed in Stockholm (May 10), Atlanta (August 14), Inglewood (September 1, 2 and 4), Houston (September 23 and 24), New Orleans (September 27) and Kansas City (October 1). (Note: Per multiple references)

The penultimate act parodies a news broadcast, and is titled Mind Control. Beyoncé appears dressed in an haute couture bee-inspired costume with a desk simulating a fictional news station titled "KNTY 4 NEWS" to start the act with "America Has a Problem". Beyoncé then performs "Pure/Honey", containing elements of "Blow", whilst holding a fish-eye selfie camera. After the performance, as she exits the stage, her dancers arrive to vogue in a ballroom battle to an extended outro of the song, featuring pre-recorded commentary from Kevin Jz Prodigy, with various members of the troupe taking turns displaying dance moves as the others cheer them on. For each date (with some exceptions), Kevin would announce particular categories, each notably performed by a given member of Beyoncé's dance crew, namely Carlos Irizarry (Old Way), Aliya Janell (Shake That Ass), Aahkilah Cornelius (Sex Siren), Darius Hickman (Soft and Cunt Performance), Amari Marshall (Body), Jonte (Face + Structure), Nerita McFarlane (Runway), and Honey Balenciaga (Vogue Fem).

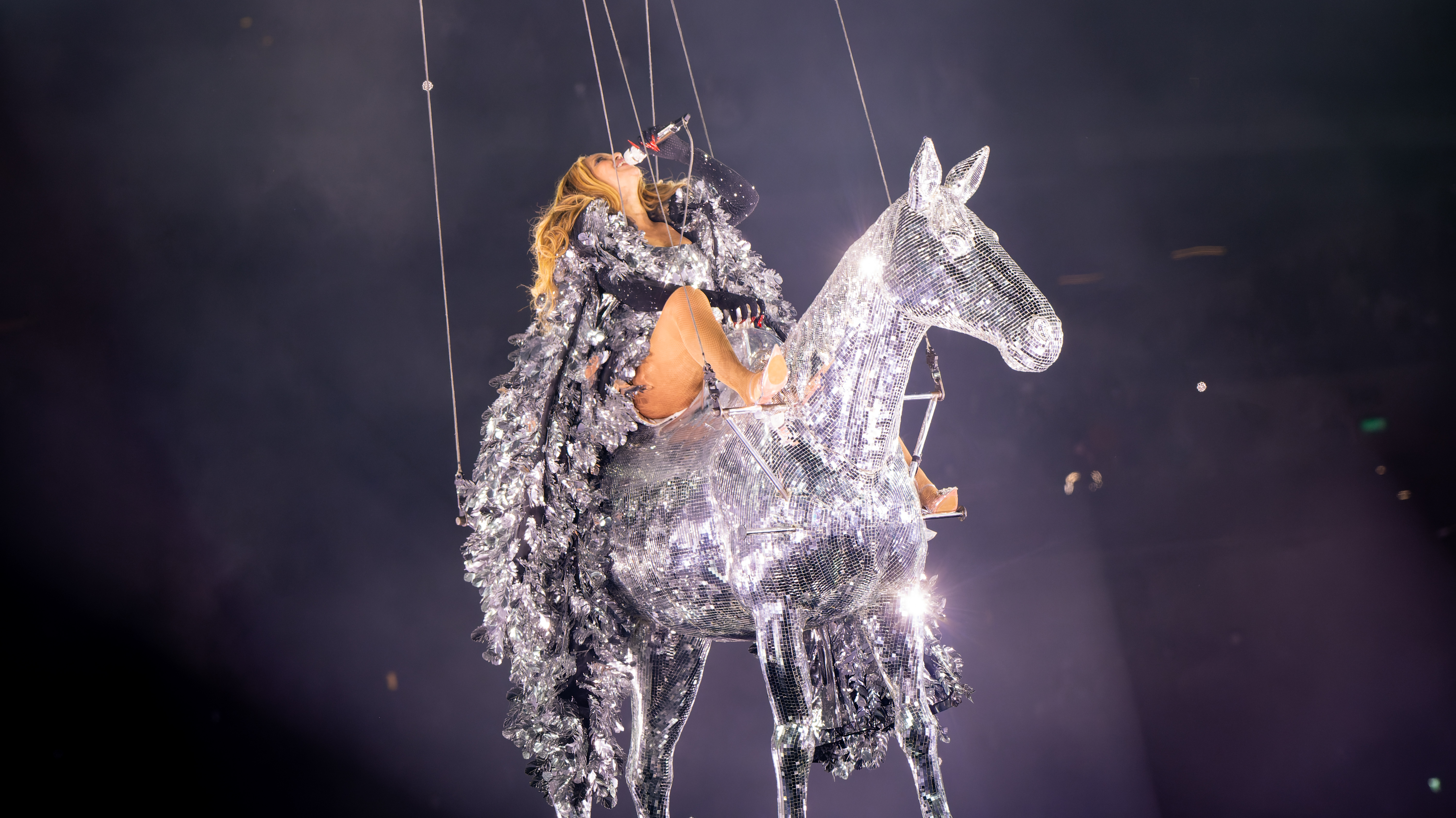
Beyoncé atop a crystal horse on the encore act performing "Summer Renaissance"

Beyoncé returns seated atop a shiny life-size horse mannequin wearing a sparkly silver dress to perform "Summer Renaissance" as the Encore. The horse is lifted above the crowd and flies Beyoncé in a circle as a victory lap, while silver confetti is released into the stadium. She then thanks the crowd and exits the stage as the screen is left with a photo of her mother Tina and her uncle Johnny, a major inspiration behind the Black, queer sounds of the Renaissance album.

== Commercial performance ==
The Renaissance World Tour broke ticket sales records worldwide. The tour may break the record for the biggest tour in music history, according to Bloomberg, and has already become both the highest-grossing tour by a female artist in 2023, and the highest-grossing tour by a black artist in history. Forbes estimated that the tour could gross up to $2.4 billion, while Rolling Stone described the tour as "one of the most in-demand concerts in recent memory". The Root deemed the tour's demand as "wild" and "unprecedented" for female artists and black artists.

The tour topped the May Boxscore report with a "massive" gross of $154 million, with Beyoncé being the first woman to achieve this in four years. According to Billboard Boxscore, the Renaissance World Tour earned $127.6 million over 11 shows between July 8–30, claiming the largest one-month sum for any artist since the Boxscore archives began in the mid-1980s. In August 2023, the Renaissance World Tour grossed $179.3 million, making it the highest one-month gross for tours, replacing its previous record.

The tour dominated the Year-End Billboard Boxscore Top Tours chart, claiming the highest position. generating an astounding $570.5M in revenue and attracting an impressive audience of 2.7M people across 55 shows; it also became the seventh-highest-grossing concert tour of all time and the highest-grossing concert tour by a woman in 2023 since the Boxscore archives, breaking the previous record of Madonna's Sticky & Sweet Tour. As of August 31, 2023, Live Nation Entertainment reported that the Renaissance World Tour has grossed $579 million, becoming Beyoncé's highest-grossing tour, surpassing the previous the Formation World Tour, the highest-grossing tour for both an R&B artist and a black female artist. In addition, the Renaissance World Tour was Live Nation's top-grossing tour of 2023 and a major driver of its record revenue.

=== Venue records ===
†	Indicates a former venue record

Venue records of the Renaissance World Tour
Dates (2023)	Venue	Country	Description
May 10–11	Friends Arena	Sweden	First female and Black act to headline two shows on a single tour
May 14	King Baudouin Stadium	Belgium	Highest single-day attendance for a female act in the 21st century (53,062)
May 17	Principality Stadium	United Kingdom	Highest attendance for a female act (52,756)
May 20	BT Murrayfield Stadium	United Kingdom	Highest attendance for a female act (55,834)
May 26	Stade de France	France	Most career performances by a female act (6 shows) †
May 29 – June 4	Tottenham Hotspur Stadium	United Kingdom	First act to headline three to five shows on a single tour
May 29 – June 4	Tottenham Hotspur Stadium	United Kingdom	Highest gross by a Black or American act ($38.9 million)
May 29 – June 4	Tottenham Hotspur Stadium	United Kingdom	Highest gross in the stadium's history ($38.9 million)
June 8	Estadi Olímpic Lluís Companys	Spain	Highest single-day attendance for a female act (52,889)
June 11	Orange Vélodrome	France	First Black woman to headline the venue
June 11	Orange Vélodrome	France	Highest gross in the stadium's history ($7.07 million)
June 27–28	PGE Narodowy	Poland	First female act to headline two shows for a single tour
June 27–28	PGE Narodowy	Poland	Highest gross in the stadium's history ($12.3 million) †
July 17	L&N Federal Credit Union Stadium	United States	First Black act to headline the venue
July 17	L&N Federal Credit Union Stadium	United States	Highest gross in the stadium's history ($6.45 million)
July 26	Ford Field	United States	Highest gross in the stadium's history ($9.96 million) †
July 29–30	MetLife Stadium	United States	First Black soloist to headline two shows for a single tour
July 29–30	MetLife Stadium	United States	Highest gross in the stadium's history ($33 million)
August 5 and 6	FedExField	United States	Highest gross in the stadium's history ($29.3 million)
August 9	Bank of America Stadium	United States	First female act to headline the venue
August 9	Bank of America Stadium	United States	Highest gross in the stadium's history ($12.2 million)
August 11–14	Mercedes-Benz Stadium	United States	First Black act to headline to headline three shows for a single tour
August 11–14	Mercedes-Benz Stadium	United States	Highest gross in the stadium's history ($39.8 million)
August 26–27	Allegiant Stadium	United States	First Black act to headline to headline two shows for a single tour
September 1–4	SoFi Stadium	United States	First Black woman to headline one to three shows for a single tour
September 1–4	SoFi Stadium	United States	Highest gross in the stadium's history ($45.5 million) †
October 1	GEHA Field at Arrowhead Stadium	United States	First Black woman to headline the venue

== Critical reception ==
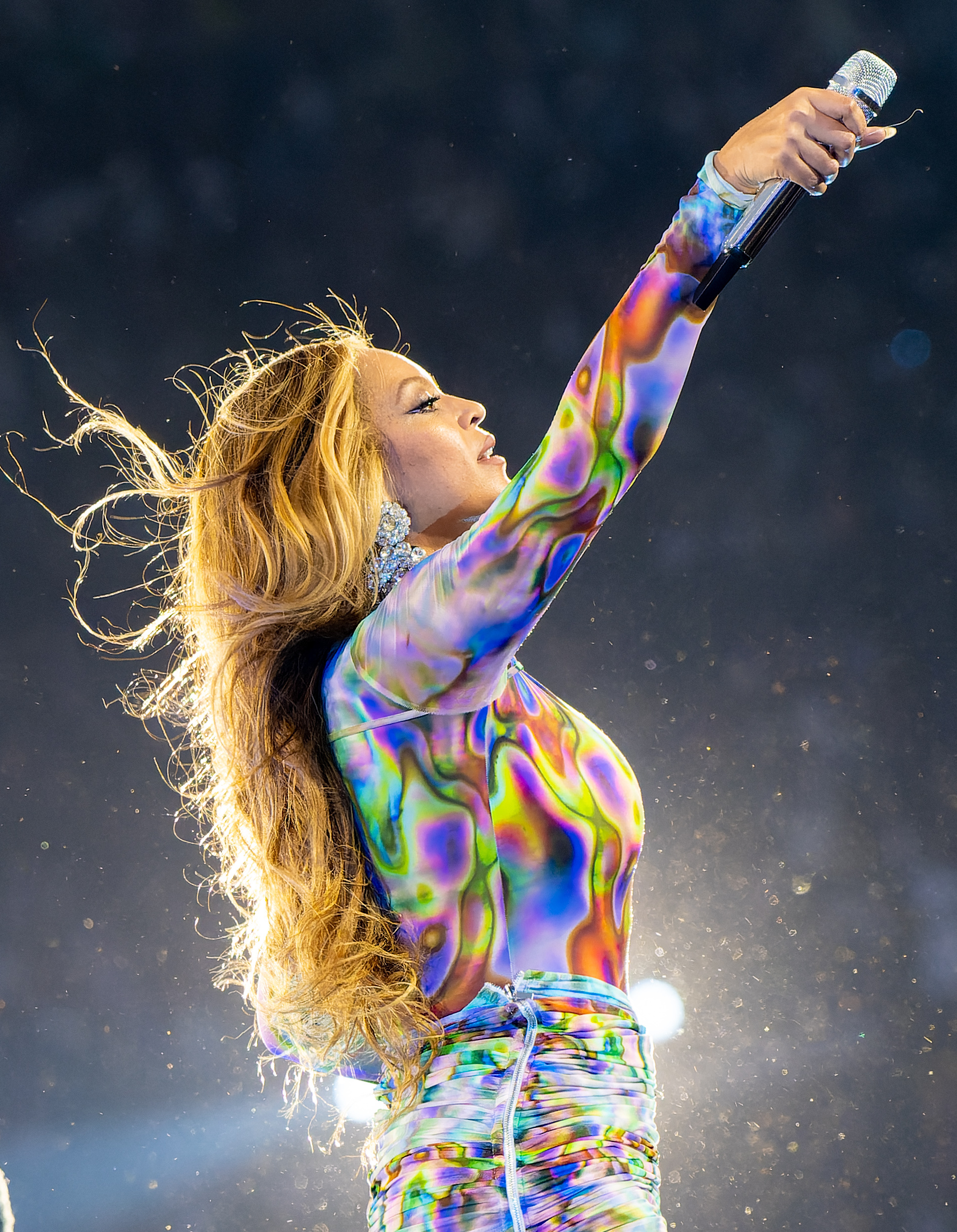
Beyoncé was praised for her stage presence and vocal performance.

The tour received rave reviews from critics, who praised the spectacle of the show. During the European tour length, in a five-star review for The Guardian, Malcolm Jack declared the tour "the greatest pop show on Earth", pushing "21st-century live entertainment another lavish leap forward". In another five-star review, The Scotsman's David Pollock described it as "the most essential stadium concert tour of the 21st century so far" and a game-changer for the music industry. Neil McCormick, chief music critic for The Telegraph, also gave the show 5 out of 5 stars, remarking that "We've seen plenty of multimedia rock extravaganzas and state of the art pop spectaculars, but this was something else: a sci-fi stadium-scale superclub, the greatest disco in the known universe" while also praising Beyoncé's "absurdly powerhouse singing".

Kitty Empire declared the tour a "masterclass", describing it as a "banging, progressive, LGBTQ+-embracing, Afrofuturist extravaganza" that encourages concertgoers to feel joyous and liberated. Rolling Stone's Brittany Spanos described it as a "once-in-a-lifetime show", praising Beyoncé's vocal performance and crowd interaction. In a review for the Evening Standard, Emma Loffhagen wrote that the tour pushes "the boundaries of 21st-century performance technology", with innovations including a UV-sensitive color-changing gown, a flying sequined horse and robotic arms. Describing it as "one of the most incredible live performances in recent memory", Refinery29's Alexis Jackson praised the tour's "visually stunning" and "elaborate" stage design.

Following the tour's first North American stop, in Toronto, The New York Times labeled the show a "Critic's Pick", with Lindsay Zoladz highlighting "Beyoncé's endurance as a world-class performer", noting that she "is the rare major pop star who prizes live vocal prowess". Julianne Escobedo Shepherd of Pitchfork defined the tour "the most ambitious" of Beyoncé's career" as "a unique representation of dance music history and Black art that imagines a more inclusive pop future", while "the Renaissance tour's most important act was bringing Beyoncé's fans together in massive numbers, creating a space in which joy can build and attendees can experience sweet release. That's what dance music, at its beating heart, is about."

Vogue writer André-Naquian Wheeler stated that Beyoncé "has upended the typical stadium show model and turned it into an ever-changing format", taking it "to unprecedented heights". Wheeler also analyzes the look of the show as an expression of "Renaissance's ballroom-inspired sonic and visual aesthetic", a way for the singer to "use fashion as a medium to silently signal a connection and appreciation towards a culture or community".

== Accolades ==
Awards and nominations for the Renaissance World Tour
Year	Ceremony	Category	Result	Ref.
2023	MTV Video Music Awards	Show of the Summer	Nominated	
2024	iHeartRadio Music Awards	Favorite Tour Style	Nominated	
2024	People's Choice Awards	The Concert Tour of the Year	Nominated	
2024	Pollstar Awards	Major Tour of the Year	Nominated	
2024	Pollstar Awards	R&B Tour of the Year	Won	
2024	Pollstar Awards	Pop Tour of the Year	Nominated	
2024	Pollstar Awards	Road Warrior of the Year (Marty Hom)	Nominated	
2024	Pollstar Awards	Brand Partnership/Live Campaign of the Year (Lexus)	Nominated	
2024	Kids' Choice Awards	Favorite Ticket of The Year	Nominated	

== Film ==
On October 1, 2023, the concert film Renaissance: A Film by Beyoncé was announced. Incorporating highlights from the full run of the tour and documentary footage of the development of both the Renaissance's album and spectacle, the film was first premiered privately at Samuel Goldwyn Theatre in Los Angeles for invited guests on November 25, and then premiered publicly at Leicester Square Theater on November 30. It released in theaters worldwide on December 1.

== Legacy ==
The Renaissance World Tour has had a significant impact and has been described as a cultural phenomenon by critics. (Note: Per multiple references) In an article for Yahoo News, Zayna Allen wrote that it is certain that "this is a tour that will go down in history". Boardroom's Vinciane Ngomsi wrote that the tour "will have set a precedent for how to produce a show that millions are willing to spend large sums on". Grazia journalist Aaliyah Harry said that the tour "spearheaded a cultural movement" by supporting and elevating the LGBTQ+ community and creating fashion trends. A 30-year cap on concerts in Sydney's Allianz Stadium was lifted after Beyoncé's announcement of the tour. This led to a "stadium war", with business executives petitioning Venues NSW to instead prioritize the larger Accor Stadium as the "best venue to secure Beyoncé". A tumbler that Beyoncé was spotted using on tour sold out on Amazon. Patrick Starr's One/Size On 'Til Dawn Matte Waterproof Setting Spray sold out after Beyoncé used it on tour.

=== Economy ===
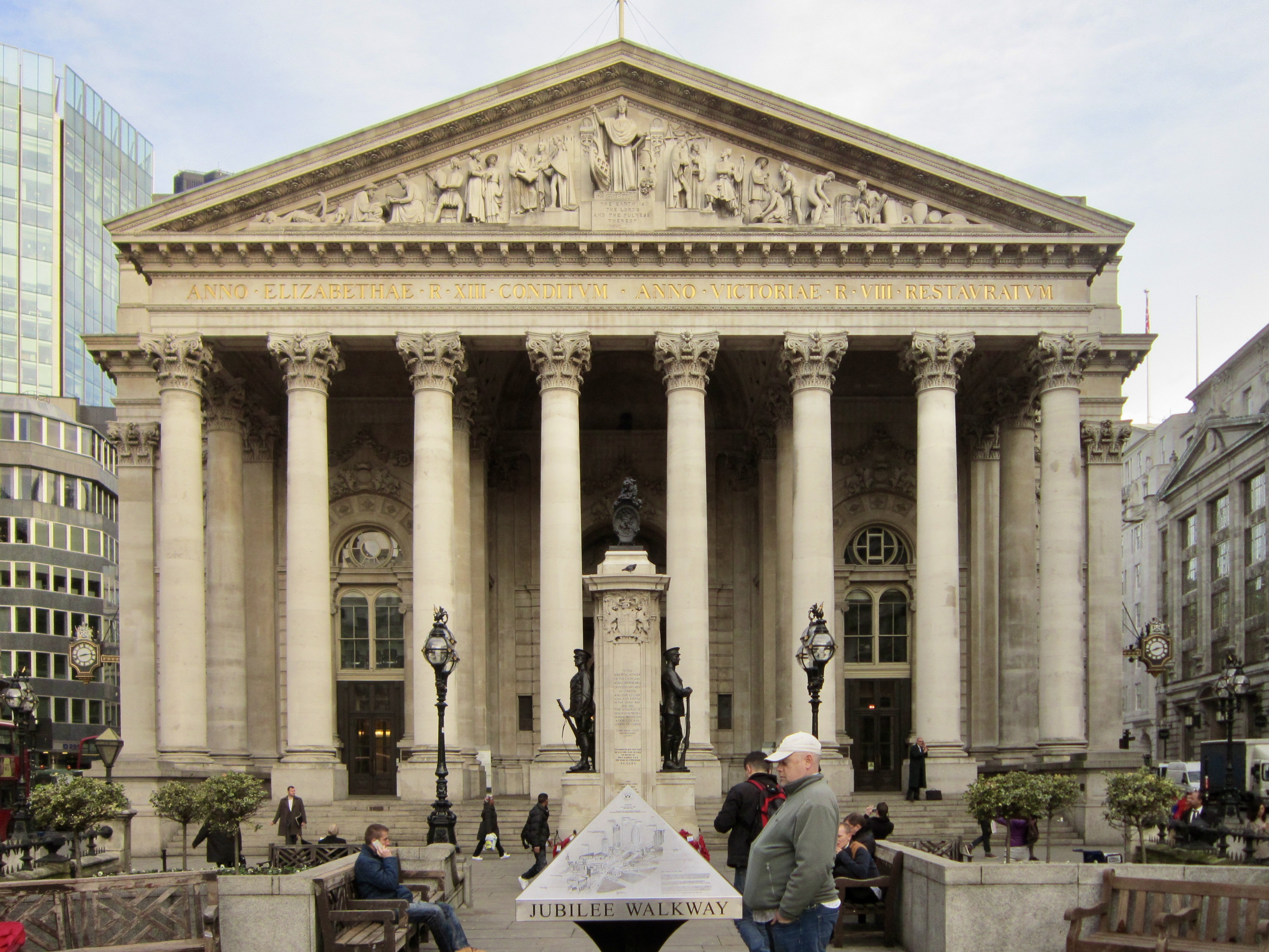
Revenue generated around the Renaissance World Tour contributed to inflation in the UK and Sweden, according to economists.

The BBC said that the Renaissance World Tour "marks a big economic moment", boosting countries' economies in a phenomenon dubbed the "Beyoncé effect", "Beyoncé bump", "Beyoncé blip" and "Beyflation" by experts. The tour raised inflation in Sweden, due to the additional spending around Beyoncé's shows in Stockholm. Danske Bank Chief Economist Michael Grahn described the phenomenon as "very rare" and "astonishing for a single event", adding: "We haven't seen this before." In the UK, the tour led to an unexpected increase in consumer price index which led to an increase in inflation by the Bank of England. The tour contributed to a 6.8 percent rise in recreation and culture spending, the fastest in 30 years, which the Office for National Statistics said was the biggest driver for the rise in inflation. Morgan Stanley warned clients of a similar rise in inflation in the US, with global chief economist Seth Carpenter saying: "The Beyoncé effect should keep us from getting too complacent."

The tour boosted the local economies of the cities it visited. QuestionPro estimated the tour could generate $4.5 billion in economic activity, which is similar to the revenue that the 2008 Summer Olympics of Beijing ($3.6 billion). Brett House, economist at Columbia Business School, said that the tour has helped create a "gentle cool-down" of economic activity in the US during the summer, instead of the usual abrupt stop. Professor Tom Smith of Emory University's Goizueta Business School used the Renaissance World Tour as a case study in his lectures about events that have a significant impact on markets. The tour's stop in Atlanta created an additional $10 million in revenue for local businesses.

Hotel prices "skyrocketed" in Stockholm during the tour's stops in the city, and the city's tourism board, Visit Stockholm, attributed high levels of tourism and almost full hotel occupancy to the "Beyonce effect". British hotel chain Travelodge said that the tour helped them achieve "record-breaking [financial] results", with their hotels in London selling out during Beyoncé's concerts in the city. More than 90% of hotels in the vicinity of Tottenham Hotspur Stadium were booked up for the dates of Beyoncé's shows in London months in advance, and the price of hotel rooms in Sunderland soared by almost 600% for the night of Beyoncé's concert. Hotel room prices soared in Edinburgh for the date of the concert, with the prices of hotel rooms increasing by more than 360% and occupancy reaching 95.1%. In Cardiff, 95.7% of hotel rooms were booked up for the date of Beyoncé's concert.

Washington, D.C.'s Metro extended services by 30 minutes for the concert. After a delay due to the storm, Beyoncé paid the Metro $100,000 to stay open for an additional hour, covering the cost of running more trains and keeping all 98 stations open. In Santa Clara, VTA, BART and Caltrain all announced that they were increasing the number of trains and extending service hours for Beyoncé's shows in the city. There was also special transit organized for the concert in New Jersey, which included Beyoncé trivia, merchandise giveaways, and choreography practice. Amtrak launched a new program to help concertgoers travel to the tour's US stops.

=== Fashion ===
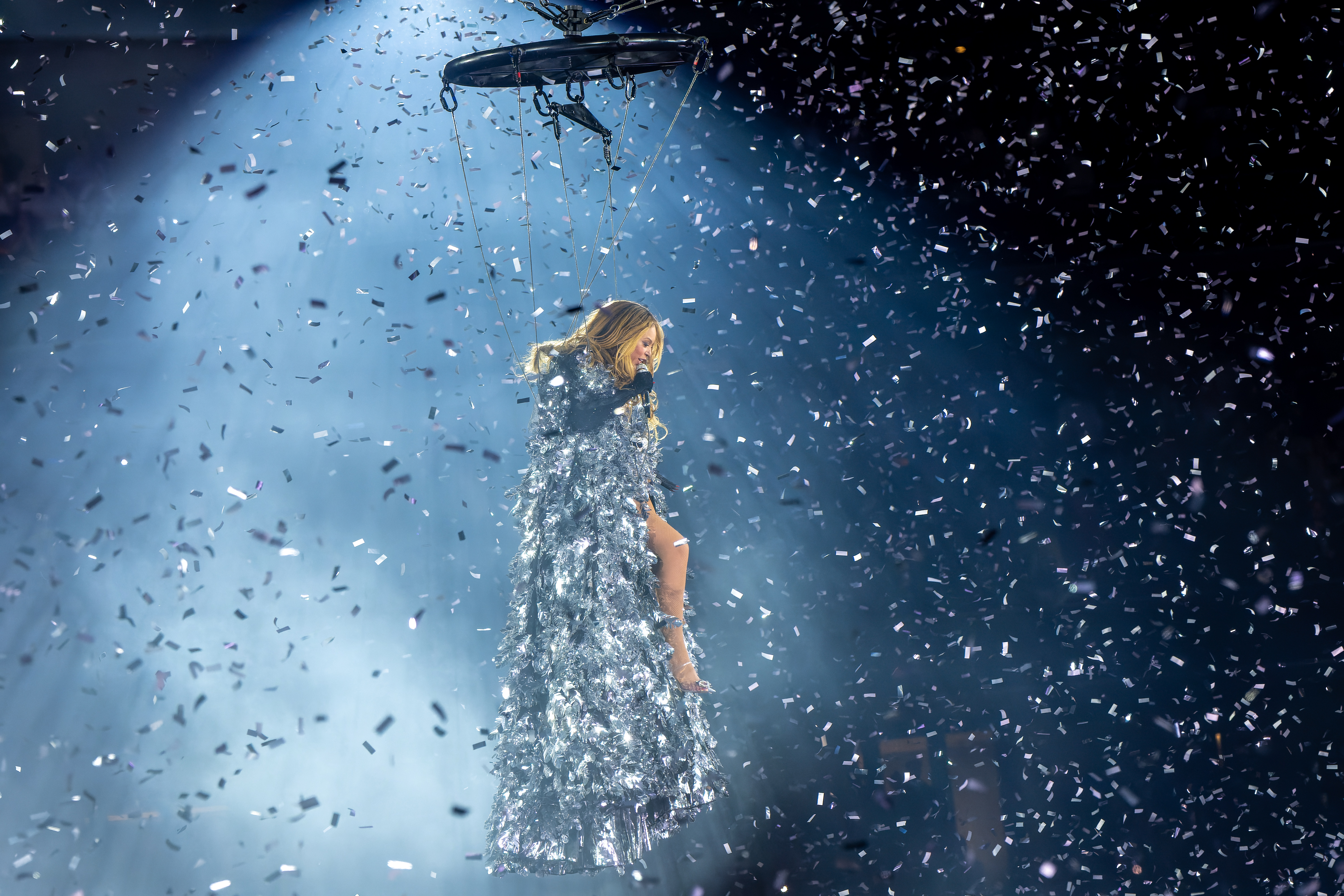
Demand for metallic clothing, inspired by Beyoncé's outfits, increased by almost 700%.

According to Boardroom, the tour had a significant impact on fashion. Women's Wear Daily reported that it generated $187 million in "media impact value" for the multiple brands that the singer worn at the various stops along the tour, including $7.7 million for Alexander McQueen, $7.2 million for Tiffany & Co., $5.6 million for Balmain, and $3.7 million for Valentino. Lauren Cochrane, senior fashion writer at The Guardian, described Beyoncé's concerts as "the new designer catwalk". Designer David Koma said that it was "amazing exposure" and "wonderful" to be part of such an "incredible, culture-defining event". Koma added: "The visibility is incredible. Social media mentions, digital and print articles, and word of mouth – there’s an immediate rise in interest."

Beyoncé's disco-inspired metallic tour outfits made silver the reigning fashion trend of spring/summer 2023. The tour increased worldwide demand for silver and metallic outfits, with consumer interest rising by almost 700% and stores filling stock with silver clothing. Chrome nails and metallic boots also became fashion trends due to the tour. Social commerce marketplaces Depop and Poshmark reported a rise in demand for silver clothing and a 500% increase in sales for items with "Renaissance" in the description or title. British supermodel Naomi Campbell designed a collection with metallic clothing inspired by the Renaissance World Tour, saying that it is "no longer a concert" but a movement. Small businesses also saw a surge in sales of silver items, with Etsy reporting a 25% increase in demand.

Concertgoers were noted for creating outfits with metallic clothing inspired by the show, with news organizations analyzing the phenomenon. Public figures also participated in the trend, including US Vice President Kamala Harris, Prince Harry and Meghan, Duchess of Sussex, Diana Ross, Katy Perry and Kim Kardashian. (Note: Per multiple references) British singer Adele said that she stayed up until 3 am buying metallic clothing on Amazon for the concert, while American comedian Rosie O'Donnell sought the help of fans to find suitable silver clothing. Retailers created and marketed clothing inspired by outfits from the tour. British luxury retailer Flannels, which Beyoncé partnered with to open a merchandise store in London, said that an increase in demand "was immediate" and that engagement continued to grow "with incredible momentum", noting thousands of viral social media posts, long queues and sold-out products.

=== Honors ===
- Leading up to the arrival of the Renaissance World Tour in Philadelphia, Fox 29 news anchor Alex Holley paid homage to Beyoncé by imitating her "America Has A Problem" performance on television with her co-news anchors.
- In Minneapolis, Mayor Jacob Frey proclaimed July 20 as "Bey Day". Tim Walz, governor of Minnesota, also declared July 20 as "Beyoncé Day" in the state.
- New Jersey governor Phil Murphy proclaimed Beyoncé as "Queen Honey-Bey" in honor of her East Rutherford shows.
- Maryland governor Wes Moore proclaimed August 6 as "Beyoncé Day".
- Georgia's Own Credit Union celebrated Beyoncé's opening Atlanta show with a message saying "Welcome to BEY-T-L" on its building sign. Atlanta City Council dubbed August 11 as "Beyoncé Day".
- New York's Circle Line Cruises ran a sold-out event in which a three-level cruise ship with hundreds of fans was transformed into a Beyoncé-themed party where participants learned the Renaissance World Tour choreography.
- St. Louis mayor Tishaura Jones declared August 21 as "Queen Bey Day".
- The Illuminarium Experiences in Las Vegas is set to host a Beyoncé-themed show on August 25, 2023.
- Santa Clara presented Beyoncé with a key to the city; Mayor of the City invited Beyoncé to be the city's honorary mayor for a day ahead of her show at Levi's Stadium.

== Philanthropy ==
As with previous tours, Beyoncé supported communities in the cities she performs in. Throughout the tour, Beyoncé's BeyGOOD Foundation provided 1,000 small business owners from marginalized communities with grant opportunities, celebration luncheons, and resources to support entrepreneurship. Beyoncé also donated scholarships worth $1 million to students in colleges and universities in cities she performed in during the tour.

Beyoncé donated $10,000 to a Nigerian restaurant in London that was at risk of closing down due to COVID-19 pandemic. The contribution was facilitated by a fund established by Beyoncé during the tour. This fund was specifically designed to aid small businesses impacted by economic inequalities in the regions where her performances took place.

Beyoncé collaborated with the American luxury jewelry house Tiffany & Co. to release a limited-edition Return to Tiffany x Beyoncé Collection inspired by her Renaissance World Tour. All profits from the sale of this collection were donated to the ABOUT LOVE Scholarship Program, a partnership between Tiffany & Co., BeyGOOD, and the Shawn Carter Foundation, benefiting students in the arts and creative fields at historically black colleges and universities.

== Set list ==
Adapted from the tour credits listed on Beyoncé's website and press coverage of the show, this setlist represents the opening night setlist performed on May 10, 2023, in Stockholm. Variations to the setlist over the course of the concert run are noted below.

Opening Act

"The Signboard" video introduction

1. "Dangerously in Love 2"
2. "Flaws and All" (contains elements of "Luchini AKA This Is It" and "Adventures in the Land of Music")
3. "1+1" / "I'm Goin' Down"
4. "I Care"

Act I – Renaissance

"Opera Intro" and "Loop the Sample" interludes (contain samples of "Explode" and "Where U At?")

5. "I'm That Girl" (contains elements of "Apeshit")
6. "Cozy"
7. "Alien Superstar" (contains elements of "Sweet Dreams")
8. "Lift Off" (contains elements of "What is Time")

"7/11" (Les Twins dance break)

Act II – Motherboard

"Motherboard" interlude (contains elements of "Can You Feel It")

9. "Cuff It" / "Cuff It (Wetter Remix)" (contains interpolations of "Love You Down")
10. "Energy"
11. "Break My Soul" / "Break My Soul (The Queens Remix)" (contains elements of "Follow Me" and "Wanna Be Starting Something")

Act III – Opulence

"Opulence" interlude (contains elements of "No Angel", "Jack Your Body" and "Let No Man Put Asunder")

12. "Formation"
13. "Diva" (contains elements of "Countdown" and "Just Wanna Rock")
14. "Run the World (Girls)"
15. "My Power"
16. "Black Parade" (contains elements of "Alright", "Tanzania" and "Pusherman")
17. "Savage (Remix)" (contains elements of "Yoncé" and "Still Tippin'")
18. "Partition"

Act IV – Anointed

"Anointed" interlude (contains samples of "Yoncé", "To Mend a Broken Heart" and "Family Feud" and "Haya")

19. "Church Girl" (contains elements of "Ego", "Party" and "Pass the Courvoisier, Part II")
20. "Get Me Bodied"
21. "Before I Let Go" (contains elements of "Freakum Dress")
22. "Rather Die Young"
23. "Love On Top" (contains elements of "I Want You Back")
24. "Crazy in Love"

"Band Jam" instrumental outro ("Work It Out", "Green Light", and "Freedom")

Act V – Anointed Part II

"Love Hangover" (background singers intermission)

25. "Plastic Off the Sofa"
26. "Virgo's Groove" / "Naughty Girl" (contains elements of "Rocket", "Speechless", "Signs", "Cater 2 U", "Say My Name" and "Dance for You")
27. "Move" (contains elements of "Move Ya Body" and "Free Mind")
28. "Heated" (contains elements of "Into You")

"Already" (Les Twins dance break; contains samples of "Say Yeah" and "Run Risk" by Braintear Spookie)

Act VI – Memories Run Through My Wires

"Memories Run Through My Wires" interlude (contains elements of "Kitty Klap (MikeQ Remix)", "Flawless" and "End of Time")

29. "Thique" (contains elements of "Toxic")
30. "All Up in Your Mind"
31. "Drunk in Love"

Act VII – Mind Control

"Mind Control" interlude

32. "America Has a Problem"
33. "Pure/Honey" / "Blow"

Ballroom dance break

34. "Summer Renaissance"

=== Notes ===
- The "Memories Run Through My Wires" section was performed only at the opening night show in Stockholm, the third show in Atlanta, and the shows in Inglewood, Houston, New Orleans and Kansas City. This section was omitted from all other concerts.
- Beginning with the May 20, 2023, show in Edinburgh, Scotland, Beyoncé incorporated elements of the remix of "America Has a Problem" featuring Kendrick Lamar in her performance of the song.
- Beginning with the May 26, 2023, show in Paris, France, Beyoncé's daughter Blue Ivy Carter occasionally joined the stage to dance to "My Power" and "Black Parade". She was subsequently named a dancer in the official tour credits.
- Beginning with the May 29, 2023, show in London, England, Beyoncé performed a cover of "River Deep – Mountain High" by Ike & Tina Turner, following "I Care", as a tribute to Tina following her death.
  - This song was shortened from the second Warsaw concert on June 28, 2023, to the end of the tour.
- At the June 21, 2023, show in Hamburg, Germany, Beyoncé sang part of "My Power" a cappella as a tribute to the recently deceased Andre Jose Marshall II, brother of the tour's dance co-captain Amari Marshall, who only appeared onstage for this segment of the show to dedicate a dance solo to him after a moment of silence.
- At the second shows in Warsaw, Poland on June 28, 2023, and in Washington D.C on August 6, "Rather Die Young" and "Love on Top" were not performed.
- Beginning with the July 29, 2023, show in East Rutherford, elements of "Delresto (Echoes)" were incorporated into the "Renaissance" interlude.
- During the show in Glendale on August 24, 2023, there was a malfunction of the sound system during "Alien Superstar". Beyoncé left the stage and the concert stopped for 10 minutes, after which Beyoncé restarted the song wearing a new outfit.
- At the September 4, 2023, show in Inglewood, Beyoncé spotted old friend Tia Mowry in the audience, blew her a kiss, and then spontaneously interpolated a portion of "Yeah, Yeah, Yeah" from Mowry's childhood girl group Voices into "1+1". Later that same evening, Diana Ross joined the Pure Honey singers onstage for their performance of "Love Hangover" and led the audience in singing "Happy Birthday" to Beyoncé. Kendrick Lamar also joined Beyoncé onstage to perform his verse on the "America Has a Problem" remix.
- At the September 23 and 24, 2023, shows in Houston, Megan Thee Stallion joined Beyoncé onstage to perform "Savage Remix".

== Tour dates ==
List of concerts
Date (2023)	City	Country	Venue	Attendance	Revenue
May 10	Stockholm	Sweden	Friends Arena	90,169 / 90,169	$9,802,155
May 11	Stockholm	Sweden	Friends Arena	90,169 / 90,169	$9,802,155
May 14	Brussels	Belgium	King Baudouin Stadium	53,062 / 53,062	$6,529,627
May 17	Cardiff	Wales	Principality Stadium	52,756 / 52,756	$6,967,662
May 20	Edinburgh	Scotland	BT Murrayfield Stadium	55,834 / 55,834	$7,872,596
May 23	Sunderland	England	Stadium of Light	44,790 / 44,790	$6,217,446
May 26	Saint-Denis (Note: Labelled as Paris in promotional material.)	France	Stade de France	68,624 / 68,624	$9,402,605
May 29	London	England	Tottenham Hotspur Stadium	240,330 / 240,330	$38,986,169
May 30	London	England	Tottenham Hotspur Stadium	240,330 / 240,330	$38,986,169
June 1	London	England	Tottenham Hotspur Stadium	240,330 / 240,330	$38,986,169
June 3	London	England	Tottenham Hotspur Stadium	240,330 / 240,330	$38,986,169
June 4	London	England	Tottenham Hotspur Stadium	240,330 / 240,330	$38,986,169
June 8	Barcelona	Spain	Estadi Olímpic Lluís Companys	52,889 / 52,889	$6,694,569
June 11	Marseille	France	Orange Vélodrome	56,352 / 56,352	$7,070,570
June 15	Cologne	Germany	RheinEnergieStadion	41,166 / 41,166	$5,437,729
June 17	Amsterdam	Netherlands	Johan Cruyff Arena	97,657 / 97,657	$12,817,577
June 18	Amsterdam	Netherlands	Johan Cruyff Arena	97,657 / 97,657	$12,817,577
June 21	Hamburg	Germany	Volksparkstadion	43,335 / 43,335	$5,757,020
June 24	Frankfurt	Germany	Deutsche Bank Park	42,280 / 42,280	$5,852,675
June 27	Warsaw	Poland	PGE Narodowy	108,141 / 108,141	$12,378,058
June 28	Warsaw	Poland	PGE Narodowy	108,141 / 108,141	$12,378,058
July 8	Toronto	Canada	Rogers Centre	76,577 / 76,577	$18,340,330
July 9	Toronto	Canada	Rogers Centre	76,577 / 76,577	$18,340,330
July 12	Philadelphia	United States	Lincoln Financial Field	52,181 / 52,181	$11,976,831
July 15	Nashville	United States	Nissan Stadium	44,742 / 44,742	$9,412,176
July 17	Louisville	United States	L&N Federal Credit Union Stadium	41,818 / 41,818	$6,450,896
July 20	Minneapolis	United States	Huntington Bank Stadium	39,415 / 39,415	$8,217,178
July 22	Chicago	United States	Soldier Field	97,686 / 97,686	$30,115,863
July 23	Chicago	United States	Soldier Field	97,686 / 97,686	$30,115,863
July 26	Detroit	United States	Ford Field	44,554 / 44,554	$9,963,756
July 29	East Rutherford (Note: Labelled as New York City in promotional material.)	United States	MetLife Stadium	106,056 / 106,056	$33,082,997
July 30	East Rutherford	United States	MetLife Stadium	106,056 / 106,056	$33,082,997
August 1	Foxborough (Note: Labelled as Boston in promotional material.)	United States	Gillette Stadium	49,740 / 49,740	$13,801,160
August 5	Landover (Note: Labelled as Washington, D.C. in promotional material.)	United States	FedExField	97,909 / 97,909	$29,392,299
August 6	Landover	United States	FedExField	97,909 / 97,909	$29,392,299
August 9	Charlotte	United States	Bank of America Stadium	53,612 / 53,612	$12,227,012
August 11	Atlanta	United States	Mercedes-Benz Stadium	156,317 / 156,317	$39,849,890
August 12	Atlanta	United States	Mercedes-Benz Stadium	156,317 / 156,317	$39,849,890
August 14	Atlanta	United States	Mercedes-Benz Stadium	156,317 / 156,317	$39,849,890
August 16	Tampa	United States	Raymond James Stadium	55,408 / 55,408	$13,158,166
August 18	Miami Gardens (Note: Labelled as Miami in promotional material.)	United States	Hard Rock Stadium	47,487 / 47,487	$14,362,704
August 21	St. Louis	United States	The Dome at America's Center	45,836 / 45,836	$7,064,451
August 24	Glendale (Note: Labelled as Phoenix in promotional material.)	United States	State Farm Stadium	54,705 / 54,705	$8,226,165
August 26	Paradise (Note: Labelled as Las Vegas in promotional material.)	United States	Allegiant Stadium	86,465 / 86,465	$25,784,512
August 27	Paradise	United States	Allegiant Stadium	86,465 / 86,465	$25,784,512
August 30	Santa Clara (Note: Labelled as San Francisco in promotional material.)	United States	Levi's Stadium	49,613 / 49,613	$15,402,846
September 1 (Note: Originally scheduled to take place on September 3, 2023, it was rescheduled for logistic reasons.)	Inglewood (Note: Labelled as Los Angeles in promotional material.)	United States	SoFi Stadium	155,567 / 155,567	$45,540,402
September 2	Inglewood	United States	SoFi Stadium	155,567 / 155,567	$45,540,402
September 4	Inglewood	United States	SoFi Stadium	155,567 / 155,567	$45,540,402
September 11	Vancouver	Canada	BC Place	38,342 / 38,342	$7,923,348
September 14 (Note: Originally scheduled to take place on September 13, 2023, it was rescheduled for logistic reasons.)	Seattle	United States	Lumen Field	56,763 / 56,763	$12,459,518
September 21	Arlington (Note: Labelled as Dallas in promotional material.)	United States	AT&T Stadium	52,953 / 52,953	$13,849,491
September 23	Houston	United States	NRG Stadium	123,308 / 123,308	$31,332,332
September 24	Houston	United States	NRG Stadium	123,308 / 123,308	$31,332,332
September 27	New Orleans	United States	Caesars Superdome	49,265 / 49,265	$10,802,708
October 1 (Note: Originally scheduled to take place on September 18, 2023, it was rescheduled for logistic reasons.)	Kansas City	United States	GEHA Field at Arrowhead Stadium	53,150 / 53,150	$9,290,057
Total				2,776,854 / 2,776,854 (100%)	$579,813,546

=== Canceled show ===
List of canceled concert
Date (2023)	City	Country	Venue	Reason	Ref.
August 3	Pittsburgh	United States	Acrisure Stadium	Logistic and production issues	

== Opening DJs ==
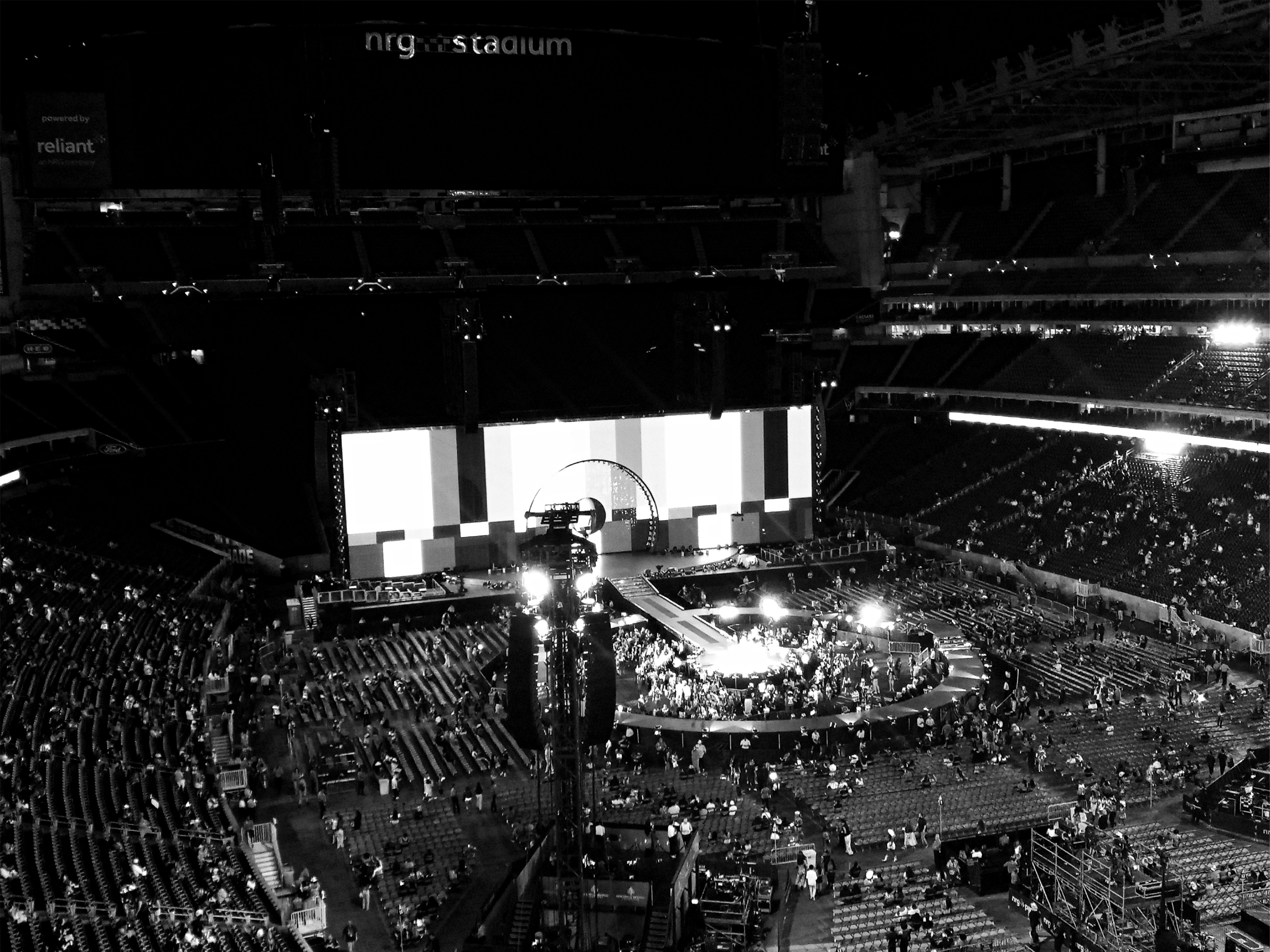
Faraway view of the B stage, where the opening DJs performed their respective sets before the show

While the tour was not advertised with an official opening act, guest DJs performed sets before the start of the show in various cities. The selection was curated by the tour's creative director Andrew Makadsi, and was noted for its centering of figures from dance music and queer nightlife scenes. The opening surprise guest appearances included: (Note: Per multiple references)

- Nia Archives (May 25, 2023, in London)
- Shygirl (June 4, 2023, in London)
- Arca (June 8, 2023, in Barcelona)
- LSDXOXO (June 21 in Hamburg and June 23, 2023, in Frankfurt)
- Ace Dillinger (July 8, 2023, in Toronto)
- Karim Olen Ash (July 9, 2023, in Toronto)
- KIA (July 12, 2023, in Philadelphia)
- Tory Stilleto (July 15, 2023, in Nashville)
- Dee Diggs (July 20, 2023, in Minneapolis)
- Ariel Zetina (July 22, 2023, in Chicago)
- Shaun J. Wright (July 23, 2023, in Chicago)
- Mike Servito (July 26, 2023, in Detroit)
- DJ MikeQ (July 29, 2023, in East Rutherford)
- Sekucci and Sterling Juan Diaz (July 30, 2023, in East Rutherford)
- DJ br0nz3_g0dd3ss (August 1, 2023, in Foxborough)
- Byrell the Great (August 5, 2023, in Landover)
- Shane Thomas (August 9, 2023, in Charlotte)
- The Carry Nation (August 11, 2023, in Atlanta)
- Leonce (August 12, 2023, in Atlanta)
- Ash Lauryn (August 14, 2023, in Atlanta)
- DJ GAY-Z (August 18, 2023, in Miami Gardens)
- Rush Davis (August 21, 2023, in St. Louis)
- Memphy (August 24, 2023, in Glendale)
- Mez Monty (August 26 and 27, 2023, in Paradise)
- Shaun Ross (August 30, 2023, in Santa Clara)
- DJ Khaled (September 1 and 2, 2023, in Inglewood)
- Kaytranada (September 4, 2023 in Inglewood)
- UNIIQU3 (September 11, 2023, in Vancouver)
- Chris Cruse (September 14, 2023, in Seattle)
- Sex Shop Boys (September 21, 2023, in Arlington)
- River Moon and Goth Jafar (September 23, 2023 in Houston)
- Mister Wallace (September 24, 2023, in Houston)
- Dangerous Rose (September 27, 2023 in New Orleans)
- Andrew Makadsi (October 1, 2023, in Kansas City)

== See also ==
- List of highest-grossing concert tours
- List of Billboard Boxscore number-one concert series of the 2020s
- List of highest-grossing concert series at a single venue
- List of highest-grossing concert tours by women
- List of highest-grossing live music artists

== Notes ==
Cities

Others
