= Jorge Dorsinville =

Brazilian movement director and choreographer

Jorge Dorsinville is a Brazilian movement director and choreographer based in New York City. His work has included fashion campaigns, editorial projects and live performances, including collaborations with photographer Annie Leibovitz and singer Robyn.

== Early life ==
Dorsinville was born in Salvador, Bahia, where he grew up in the Cosme de Farias neighborhood. His interest in dance developed after watching a traditional neighborhood performance competition.

As a teenager, he washed cars and sold clothing to pay for dance classes at the Cultural Foundation of the State of Bahia in Pelourinho.

Around 2011, Dorsinville moved to New York City as a dancer with a background in physical theatre, butoh and capoeira.

== Career ==
At age 20, Dorsinville joined the Balé do Teatro Castro Alves. He was later selected from more than 300 applicants to join Daniela Mercury's dance group, with which he spent eight years dancing and choreographing, including on international tours. He also worked with theatre directors and in the music industry, helping actors, singers and musicians develop physical expression for the stage.

After moving to New York without speaking English or having local connections, Dorsinville initially worked in a Brazilian restaurant. He later began working on fashion sets as a production assistant before taking on movement-related responsibilities. A producer who had seen his dance videos on Instagram invited him to work on a collaboration shoot for Disney and Tommy Hilfiger. The shoot featured model Stella Maxwell and actor Lucien Laviscount.

The May 2023 US digital cover of Elle marked what Dorsinville described as his first editorial project. He choreographed the cover, which featured model Maty Fall and was photographed by Sharif Hamza. As part of his preparation, he builds a library of gestures drawn from film, nature, architecture and music, which he then adapts with the talent.

Campaign assignments followed in 2024. Dorsinville directed movement for Balmain's Les Éternels fragrance campaign and a holiday campaign for David Yurman featuring actor Sterling K. Brown. His fashion work also included projects for Vogue and Jean Paul Gaultier.

In 2026, his work included music performances, editorial projects, campaigns and runway presentations. For Robyn, Dorsinville served as personal coach, movement director and choreographer for a performance of “Sexistential” on The Late Show with Stephen Colbert.

Fashion assignments that year included movement direction for a March Teen Vogue cover featuring figure skater Alysa Liu, Lancôme's 90th-anniversary campaign featuring Isabella Rossellini and Amanda Seyfried, and a Revlon campaign featuring Ashley Graham. He also directed movement for a PatBO show at New York Fashion Week. A May presentation in New York celebrated Stella McCartney's collaboration with H&M.

Dorsinville also collaborated with photographer Annie Leibovitz on Fútbol 2026, a portrait exhibition presented at the National Museum of Anthropology in Mexico City in connection with the 2026 FIFA World Cup. The photographed athletes included Kylian Mbappé, Christian Pulisic and Jonathan David. For the exhibition, Dorsinville directed the athletes' movement for the still photographs.

That July, Dorsinville directed movement for Robert Wun's haute-couture show in Paris.
