= Sexistential (song) =

- "Arca's Take" cover

Single by Robyn

from the album Sexistential
- A-side: "Talk to Me"
- Released: 7 January 2026
- Genre: House-pop
- Length: 2:20
- Label: Konichiwa; Young
- Songwriters: Klas Åhlund; Robyn
- Producers: Klas Åhlund; Robyn

Robyn singles chronology
"Dopamine" (2025)	"Sexistential" / "Talk to Me" (2026)	"Blow My Mind" (2026)

Lyric video
- "Sexistential" on YouTube

"Sexistential" is a song by Swedish singer Robyn from her ninth studio album, Sexistential (2026). It was released as the album's second single on 7 January 2026 by Konichiwa and Young as a double A-side with "Talk to Me". On 3 February 2026, a remix by Venezuelan producer Arca was released.

== Background and composition ==
Robyn wrote and produced "Sexistential" with Klas Åhlund. It is a house-pop song with lyrics about "the unique travails of trying to get laid during IVF treatment". Robyn was inspired to write the song after André 3000 claimed in 2023 that "no one would want to hear him rap about getting a colonoscopy". She recalled, "It was my cue. I have to do this, I have to write a rap about IVF."

== Chart performance ==
Following its release, "Sexistential" debuted at number 44 on the Swedish download chart DigiListan.

== Promotion ==
Robyn debuted "Sexistential" in concert at the Brooklyn Paramount in New York City on 31 December 2025. She performed it on The Late Show with Stephen Colbert on 7 January 2026. The performance was choreographed by Jorge Dorsinville.

An accompanying lyric video for "Sexistential" was directed by Marili Andre and released on 7 January 2026.

== Track listing ==
- Digital download / streaming
1. "Talk to Me" – 3:19
2. "Sexistential" – 2:20
- Digital download / streaming
1. "Sexistential" (Arca's Take) – 3:44

== Credits and personnel ==
Credits are adapted from Tidal.

- Robyn – composition, engineering, lyrics, production, vocals
- Niklas Flyckt – mixing
- Chris Gehringer – mastering
- Klas Åhlund – composition, engineering, production, programming

== Charts ==
Weekly chart performance for "Sexistential"
Chart (2026)	Peak position
Sweden (DigiListan)	44
