= Dee Diggs =

Dee Diggs (born 1994) is a DJ, music producer based in Brooklyn, NY. She began DJing in 2015 while attending college Boston University, and has been releasing her own music since 2023. She hosts curated parties under the name House of Diggs, and Mixmag credited her with "upholding the true essence of dance music."

== Work ==
Diggs spent years playing venues of all sizes in Boston, Massachusetts, then Brooklyn, New York. She has played famous festivals and clubs around the world including Panorama Bar in Berghain, Dwellar and Wire Festival in NYC, and Sonar in Lisbon. She was the opening DJ for Beyoncé's Renaissance Tour stop in Minneapolis in 2023.

In July 2023, she released her debut single, Toss It, to critical acclaim from outlets like DJ Mag, which noted that "the track cuts an arch through dance music’s past and present, imbuing the sunny sonic palette of '70s funk with a prodigal helping of soulful jazz realness." In April 2025 she released Love Cruise, which FindYourSounds described as "earworm vocals are joined at the hip with an expertly produced instrumental, giving a warm, sunshine feel to its infectious beat."
