= Robyn discography =

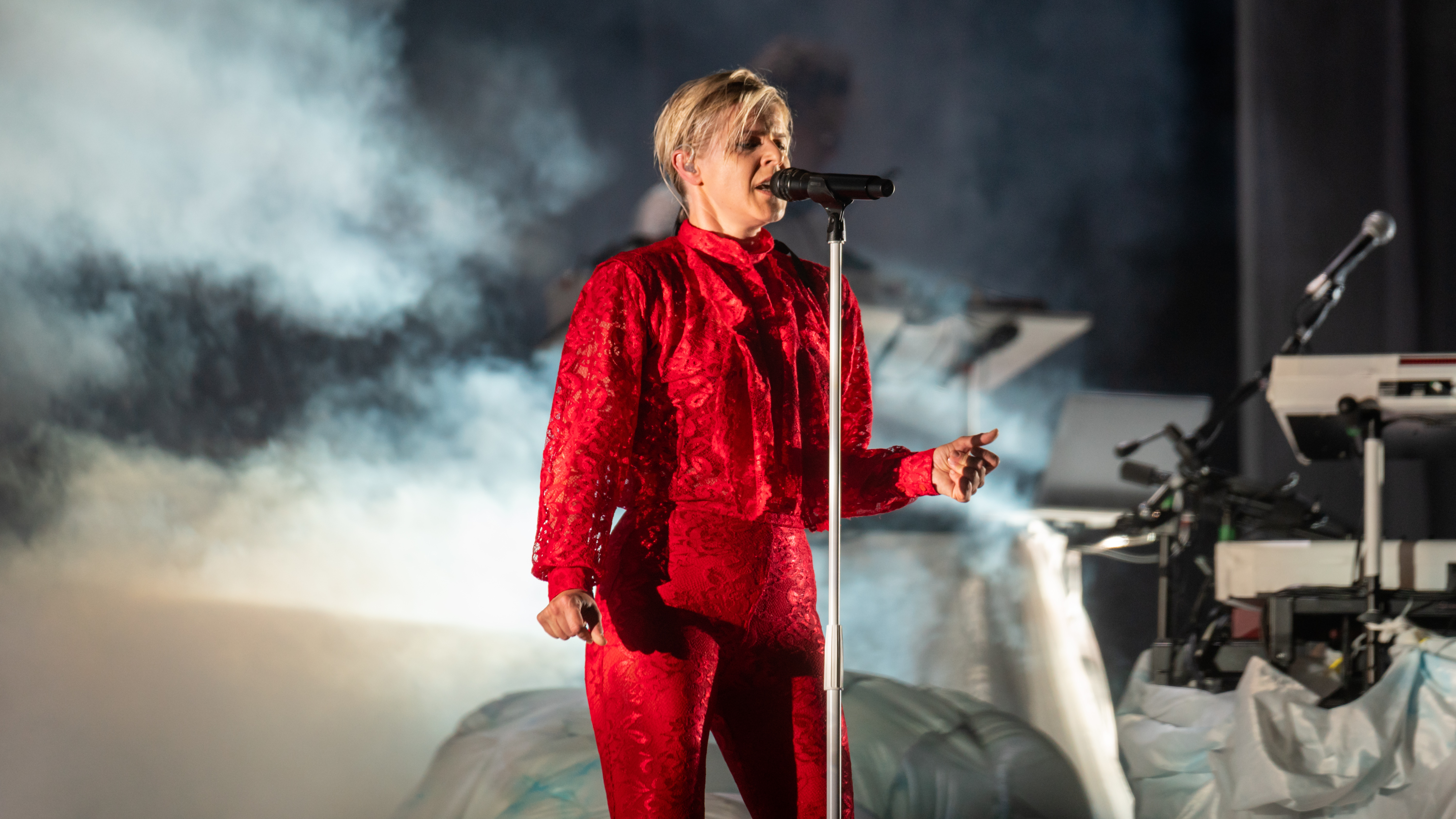
- Robyn performing at the Primavera Sound Festival in June 2019
- Studio albums: 9
- Extended plays: 5
- Compilation albums: 2
- Singles: 50
- Music videos: 45
- Promotional singles: 9

Swedish singer Robyn has released nine studio albums, one compilation album, six extended plays, 50 singles (including 17 as a featured artist), nine promotional singles, and 45 music videos.

Robyn became known in the late 1990s for her worldwide dance-pop hit "Do You Know (What It Takes)" from her debut album Robyn Is Here (1995). She co-wrote the song "Du gör mig hel igen" ("You Make Me Whole Again") for Melodifestivalen 1997. The popularity of her number-one hit single "With Every Heartbeat", and subsequent album release Robyn (2005), brought her mainstream success worldwide. In January 2009, Robyn won a Swedish Grammis award for Best Live Act 2008.

Robyn released the first of a trilogy of albums to be released over the course of 2010 titled Body Talk Pt. 1, in June of that year, peaking at number one in Sweden. It was her first album since Robyn. The album's lead single "Dancing On My Own", released a few weeks prior to the album's release, became a hit single worldwide, and brought her a 53rd Grammy Awards nomination for the category of Best Dance Recording. A follow-up album, Body Talk Pt. 2, was released on 6 September, entering straight at number one on the Swedish chart, and the final album of the trilogy, Body Talk, was released on 22 November 2010 with the first single "Indestructible". The last Body Talk single was "Call Your Girlfriend", which was released in the United States in May 2011 and became her first number-one hit on Billboard's Hot Dance Club Play chart.

== Albums ==
=== Studio albums ===
List of studio albums, with selected chart positions and certifications
Title	Album details	Peak chart positions										Certifications
Title	Album details	SWE	AUS	BEL (FL)	DEN	GER	IRE	NOR	SWI	UK	US	Certifications
Robyn Is Here	Released: 13 October 1995; Label: Ricochet, Ariola, BMG; Formats: CD, cassette	8	130	—	—	—	—	—	—	—	57	GLF: Gold; RIAA: Platinum
My Truth	Released: 17 May 1999; Label: BMG, Ricochet, RCA; Formats: CD, cassette	2	—	—	—	—	—	—	—	—	—	GLF: Platinum
Don't Stop the Music	Released: 30 October 2002; Label: BMG, Jive; Formats: CD, cassette	2	—	—	—	—	—	—	—	—	—	GLF: Platinum
Robyn	Released: 27 April 2005; Label: Konichiwa; Formats: CD, LP, digital download	1	120	73	—	—	77	35	52	11	100	GLF: Platinum; BPI: Gold
Body Talk Pt. 1	Released: 14 June 2010; Label: Konichiwa; Formats: CD, digital download	1	64	37	4	46	97	4	90	47	97	GLF: Gold; IFPI DEN: Gold
Body Talk Pt. 2	Released: 6 September 2010; Label: Konichiwa; Formats: CD, digital download	1	68	37	1	47	41	3	91	38	41	
Body Talk	Released: 22 November 2010; Label: Konichiwa; Formats: CD, LP, digital download	2	—	30	13	—	—	8	—	168	142	IFPI DEN: Platinum
Honey	Released: 26 October 2018; Label: Konichiwa, Interscope; Formats: CD, cassette, LP, digital download	1	20	10	20	65	38	2	46	21	40	
Sexistential	Released: 27 March 2026; Label: Konichiwa, Young; Formats: CD, cassette, LP, digital download, streaming	1	12	7	17	14	58	13	36	10	128	
"—" denotes a recording that did not chart or was not released in that territory.

=== Reissues ===
Title	Album details
Robyn's Best	Released: 1 June 2004; Label: BMG; Formats: CD, digital download

=== Compilation albums ===
Title	Album details
Det bästa med Robyn	Released: 30 August 2006; Label: BMG; Formats: CD, digital download

== Extended plays ==
List of extended plays, with selected chart positions
Title	EP details	Peak chart positions									
Title	EP details	AUS	CAN	DEN	GER	IRE	NOR	SWI	UK	US	US Dance
The Rakamonie EP	Released: 20 November 2006; Label: Konichiwa; Formats: CD, digital download	—	—	—	—	—	—	—	—	—	—
The Cherrytree Sessions	Released: 3 February 2009; Label: Konichiwa; Formats: CD, digital download	—	—	—	—	—	—	—	—	—	—
Body Talk Pt. 3	Released: 22 November 2010; Label: Konichiwa; Formats: CD, digital download	—	—	27	—	—	—	—	—	—	7
Do It Again (with Röyksopp)	Released: 23 May 2014; Label: Dog Triumph; Formats: CD, LP, digital download	14	15	5	70	23	3	18	20	14	1
Love Is Free (with La Bagatelle Magique)	Released: 7 August 2015; Label: Konichiwa; Formats: CD, digital download	—	—	—	—	—	—	—	111	—	1
Trust Me (with Mr. Tophat)	Released: 13 January 2017; Label: Smalltown Supersound, Konichiwa; Formats: LP, digital download	—	—	—	—	—	—	—	—	—	—
"—" denotes a recording that did not chart or was not released in that territory.

== Singles ==
=== As lead artist ===
List of singles as lead artist, with selected chart positions and certifications, showing year released and album name
Title	Year	Peak chart positions										Certifications	Album
Title	Year	SWE	BEL (FL)	CAN	DEN	GER	IRE	NL	NOR	UK	US	Certifications	Album
"You've Got That Somethin'"	1995	24	—	—	—	85	—	—	—	54	—		Robyn Is Here
"Do You Really Want Me (Show Respect)"	1995	2	—	6	4	—	—	—	7	20	— (Note: "Do You Really Want Me (Show Respect)" did not enter the Billboard Hot 100, but peaked at number 32 on the Radio Songs chart.)	GLF: Gold	Robyn Is Here
"Do You Know (What It Takes)"	1996	10	—	2	—	—	—	82	—	26	7	RIAA: Gold	Robyn Is Here
"Show Me Love"	1997	14	— (Note: "Show Me Love" did not enter the Ultratop 50, but peaked at number 12 on the Flemish Ultratip chart.)	2	—	70	—	27	—	8	7	RIAA: Gold	Robyn Is Here
"Electric"	1999	6	—	—	—	—	—	—	—	—	—	GLF: Gold	My Truth
"Play"	1999	31	—	—	—	—	—	—	—	—	—		My Truth
"My Only Reason"	1999	53	—	—	—	—	—	—	—	—	—		My Truth
"Main Thing"	2000	—	—	—	—	—	—	—	—	—	—		My Truth
"Keep This Fire Burning"	2002	3	24	—	7	—	—	52	19	—	—	GLF: Gold	Don't Stop the Music
"Don't Stop the Music"	2003	7	— (Note: "Don't Stop the Music" did not enter the Ultratop 50, but peaked at number 12 on the Flemish Ultratip chart.)	—	—	—	—	85	19	—	—		Don't Stop the Music
"Be Mine!"	2005	3	— (Note: "Be Mine!" did not enter the Ultratop 50, but peaked at number 23 on the Flemish Ultratip chart.)	—	—	59	35	—	13	10	— (Note: "Be Mine!" did not enter the Billboard Hot 100, but peaked at number 23 on the Hot Singles Sales chart.)	BPI: Silver	Robyn
"Who's That Girl"	2005	37	—	—	—	—	—	—	26	26	—		Robyn
"With Every Heartbeat" (with Kleerup)	2007	23	8	—	7	38	15	7	—	1	— (Note: "With Every Heartbeat" did not enter the Billboard Hot 100, but peaked at number four on the Hot Singles Sales chart.)	BPI: Platinum; IFPI DEN: Gold	Robyn
"Konichiwa Bitches"	2007	—	—	—	—	—	—	—	—	98	—		Robyn
"Handle Me"	2007	—	36	—	—	86	47	67	—	17	—		Robyn
"Cobrastyle"	2007	17	—	—	—	—	—	—	—	—	—		Robyn
"Dancing on My Own"	2010	1	25	—	2	67	35	—	6	8	— (Note: "Dancing on My Own" did not enter the Billboard Hot 100, but peaked at number 13 on the Bubbling Under Hot 100 Singles chart.)	BPI: Platinum; IFPI DEN: Platinum; RIAA: Platinum	Body Talk Pt. 1
"Hang with Me"	2010	2	— (Note: "Hang with Me" did not enter the Ultratop 50, but peaked at number three on the Flemish Ultratip chart.)	—	11	68	—	—	7	54	—	IFPI DEN: Gold	Body Talk Pt. 2
"Indestructible"	2010	4	23	—	13	56	—	—	—	171	—	IFPI DEN: Gold	Body Talk
"Call Your Girlfriend"	2011	43	— (Note: "Call Your Girlfriend" did not enter the Ultratop 50, but peaked at number eight on the Flemish Ultratip chart.)	—	18	—	—	—	—	55	— (Note: "Call Your Girlfriend" did not enter the Billboard Hot 100, but peaked at number six on the Hot Singles Sales chart.)	RIAA: Gold	Body Talk
"Do It Again" (with Röyksopp)	2014	16	— (Note: "Do It Again" did not enter the Ultratop 50, but peaked at number two on the Flemish Ultratip chart.)	—	18	—	91	65	—	75	—		Do It Again
"Sayit" (with Röyksopp)	2014	—	—	—	—	—	—	—	—	—	—		Do It Again
"Monument" (with Röyksopp)	2014	—	—	—	—	—	—	—	—	—	—		Do It Again
"Love Is Free" (with La Bagatelle Magique featuring Maluca)	2015	—	—	—	—	—	—	—	—	—	—		Love Is Free
"Set Me Free" (with La Bagatelle Magique)	2015	—	—	—	—	—	—	—	—	174	—		Love Is Free
"Missing U"	2018	13	— (Note: "Missing U" did not enter the Ultratop 50, but peaked at number two on the Flemish Ultratip chart.)	—	—	—	77	—	—	87	—		Honey
"Honey"	2018	23	— (Note: "Honey" did not enter the Ultratop 50, but peaked at number eight on the Flemish Ultratip chart.)	—	—	—	—	—	—	—	—		Honey
"Between the Lines"	2019	95	—	—	—	—	—	—	—	—	—		Honey
"Ever Again"	2019	22	— (Note: "Ever Again" did not enter the Ultratop 50, but peaked at number 38 on the Flemish Ultratip chart.)	—	—	—	—	—	—	—	—		Honey
"Beach 2k20"	2019	— (Note: "Beach 2k20" did not enter the Swedish Singellista Chart, but peaked at number two on the Swedish Heatseeker Chart.)	—	—	—	—	—	—	—	—	—		Honey
"Baby Forgive Me"	2019	84	—	—	—	—	—	—	—	—	—		Honey
"Impact" (with SG Lewis and Channel Tres)	2020	—	—	—	—	—	—	—	—	—	—		Times
"Buffalo Stance" (Neneh Cherry and Robyn featuring Mapei)	2022	—	—	—	—	—	—	—	—	—	—		The Versions
"Dopamine"	2025	9	—	—	— (Note: "Dopamine" did not enter the Track Top-40 chart, but peaked at number 14 on the Airplay Top-20 chart.)	—	—	—	98	— (Note: "Dopamine" did not enter the UK Singles Chart, but peaked at number 33 on the UK Singles Downloads Chart.)	—		Sexistential
"Sexistential"	2026	—	—	—	—	—	—	—	—	—	—		Sexistential
"Talk to Me"	2026	43	—	—	—	—	—	—	—	—	—		Sexistential
"Blow My Mind"	2026	— (Note: "Blow My Mind" did not enter the Swedish Singellista Chart, but peaked at number 15 on the Swedish Heatseeker Chart.)	—	—	—	—	—	—	—	—	—		Sexistential
"—" denotes a recording that did not chart or was not released in that territory.

=== As featured artist ===
List of singles as featured artist, with selected chart positions, showing year released and album name
Title	Year	Peak chart positions							Album
Title	Year	SWE	AUS	BEL (FL) Tip	NOR	UK	US Sales	US Dance Club	Album
"Roll with Me" (Blacknuss featuring Robyn, Joshua and Abel)	1996	—	—	—	—	—	—	—	Allstars
"Dream On" (Christian Falk featuring Robyn and Ola Salo)	2006	42	—	3	—	29	—	—	People Say
"This One's for You" (Fleshquartet featuring Robyn)	2006	—	—	—	—	—	—	—	Voices of Eden
"Sexual Eruption" (Fyre Department Remix) (Snoop Dogg featuring Robyn)	2008	4	63	—	—	—	—	—	Non-album single
"The Girl and the Robot" (Röyksopp featuring Robyn)	2009	25	—	3	2	—	—	—	Junior
"Caesar" (I Blame Coco featuring Robyn)	2010	—	—	—	—	—	—	—	The Constant
"Bad Gal" (Savage Skulls and Douster featuring Robyn)	2010	—	—	—	—	—	—	—	Get Rich or High Tryin'
"Cardiac Arrest" (Teddybears featuring Robyn)	2011	—	—	—	—	—	—	—	Devil's Music
"Never Will Be Mine" (Rye Rye featuring Robyn)	2011	—	—	—	—	—	—	12	Go! Pop! Bang!
"Go Kindergarten" (The Lonely Island featuring Robyn)	2013	—	—	—	—	—	—	—	The Wack Album
"Out of the Black" (Neneh Cherry featuring Robyn)	2014	—	—	—	—	—	—	—	Blank Project
"Monument" (The Inevitable End Version) (Röyksopp featuring Robyn)	2014	—	—	34	—	—	—	—	The Inevitable End
"Who Do You Love?" (Kindness featuring Robyn)	2015	—	—	—	—	—	—	—	Otherness
"Hang Me Out to Dry" (Metronomy featuring Robyn)	2016	—	—	—	—	—	—	—	Summer 08
"Trust Me" (Mr. Tophat featuring Robyn)	2016	—	—	—	—	—	4	—	Trust Me
"Salt Licorice" (Jónsi featuring Robyn)	2020	—	—	—	—	—	—	—	Shiver
"Call My Name" (Smile featuring Robyn)	2021	—	—	—	—	—	—	—	Phantom Island
"Pump It Up" (Mr. Tophat featuring Robyn and Simson)	2022	—	—	—	—	—	—	—	This Is Pop
"Life" (Jamie XX featuring Robyn)	2024	—	—	—	—	—	—	—	In Waves
"—" denotes a recording that did not chart or was not released in that territory.

=== Promotional singles ===
List of promotional singles, with selected chart positions, showing year released and album name
Title	Year	Peak chart positions		Album
Title	Year	SWE	NOR	Album
"Don't Want You Back"	1996	—	—	Robyn Is Here
"Good Thang"	1999	—	—	Non-album single
"Blow My Mind"	2002	—	—	Don't Stop the Music
"O Baby"	2003	—	—	Don't Stop the Music
"Bum Like You"	2005	—	—	Robyn
"Crash and Burn Girl"	2005	—	—	Robyn
"Fembot"	2010	3	10	Body Talk Pt. 1
"Dancehall Queen"	2010	56	—	Body Talk Pt. 1
"None of Dem" (featuring Röyksopp)	2010	—	—	Body Talk Pt. 1
"Don't Fucking Tell Me What to Do"	2010	—	—	Body Talk Pt. 1
"U Should Know Better" (featuring Snoop Dogg)	2013	—	—	Body Talk Pt. 2
"Tell You (Today)"	2014	—	—	Love Is Free
"Love Kills" (Harry Romero Remix)	2016	—	—	Non-album single
"—" denotes a recording that did not chart or was not released in that territory.

== Other charted songs ==
List of other charted songs, with selected chart positions, showing year released and album name
Title	Year	Peak chart positions			Album
Title	Year	SWE	BEL (FL) Tip	US Dance /Elec	Album
"Cry When You Get Older"	2010	44	—	— (Note: "Cry When You Get Older" did not enter the Billboard Dance/Electronic Songs chart, but peaked at number 41 on the Dance/Electronic Digital Songs chart.)	Body Talk Pt. 1
"Love Kills"	2010	35	8	—	Body Talk Pt. 2
"In My Eyes"	2010	51	—	—	Body Talk Pt. 2
"Indestructible" (Acoustic Version)	2010	54	—	—	Body Talk Pt. 2
"Time Machine"	2010	54	—	—	Body Talk
"Human Being" (featuring Zhala)	2018	64	—	49	Honey
"Because It's in the Music"	2018	69	—	—	Honey
"Send to Robin Immediately"	2018	92	—	—	Honey
"Really Real"	2026	— (Note: "Really Real" did not enter the Swedish Singellista Chart, but peaked at number 2 on the Swedish Heatseeker Chart.)	—	—	Sexistential
"Sucker for Love"	2026	60	—	—	Sexistential
"It Don't Mean a Thing"	2026	— (Note: "It Don't Mean a Thing" did not enter the Swedish Singellista Chart, but peaked at number 5 on the Swedish Heatseeker Chart.)	—	—	Sexistential
"—" denotes a recording that did not chart or was not released in that territory.

== Guest appearances ==
These songs have not appeared on a studio album released by Robyn.

Year	Song	Album / Single	Notes
1998	"Aldrig hänt"	För Amnesty	
1999	"Remember"	Quel Bordel	Recorded with Christian Falk
1999	"Celebration"	Quel Bordel	Backing vocals for Christian Falk
2000	"Ondskans tänder"	Vi Håller Inte Käften!	Recorded with Petter
2001	"Intro"	Petter	Recorded with Petter
2001	"Say You'll Walk the Distance"	On the Line	
2006	"C.C.C."	People Say	Recorded with Christian Falk
2006	"Hey U"	Crazy Itch Radio	Recorded with Basement Jaxx
2007	"Piece of Me"	Blackout	Backing vocals for Britney Spears
2011	"Every Teardrop Is a Waterfall"	BBC Radio 1's Live Lounge - Volume 6	Coldplay cover
2013	"Nitti5"	In & Ut	Recorded with Abidaz
2014	"Prophet" (Grammis Version)	"Prophet" (single)	Recorded with Zhala
2017	"That Could Have Been Me"	White Knight	Recorded with Todd Rundgren
2019	"Super Cool"	The Lego Movie 2: The Second Part Original Motion Picture Soundtrack	Recorded with Beck and the Lonely Island.
2019	"Cry Everything"	Something Like A War	Recorded with Kindness.
2019	"The Warning"	Something Like A War	Recorded with Kindness.
2021	"Secrets from a Girl (Who's Seen It All)"	Solar Power	Recorded with Lorde
2022	"All My Love"	Expansions In The NYC	Recorded with Louie Vega
2024	"The 360 remix with robyn and yung lean"	Brat and It's Completely Different but Also Still Brat	Recorded with Charli XCX and Yung Lean
2026	"Puss Puss" (Girls Trip)	Midnight Sun: Girls Trip	Remix; recorded with Zara Larsson

== Songwriting credits ==
Robyn has also written songs for other artists.

Year	Song	Artist	Album	Co-written with
1997	"Du gör mig hel igen" (Note: "Du gör mig hel igen" was an entry in Melodifestivalen 1997, where it finished fourth in the contest.)	Cajsalisa Ejemyr	Först nu	Johan Ekhé, Ulf Lindström
1997	"Först då"	Cajsalisa Ejemyr	Först nu	Cajsalisa Ejemyr, Johan Ekhé, Ulf Lindström
1997	"Ingenting"	Cajsalisa Ejemyr	Först nu	Cajsalisa Ejemyr, Johan Ekhé, Ulf Lindström
1997	"Lika barn"	Cajsalisa Ejemyr	Först nu	Cajsalisa Ejemyr, Johan Ekhé, Ulf Lindström
2003	"It's All About Me"	Jamie Meyer	It's All About Me	Jörgen Elofsson
2003	"Popstar"	Sita	Come with Me	Remee, Johan Ekhé, Ulf Lindström
2004	"What Is Love?"	Peter Andre	The Long Road Back	Kara DioGuardi, Mich Hansen, Joe Belmaati
2004	"You Found Me"	Play	Don't Stop the Music	Billy Mann, Rasmus Bähncke, René Tromborg
2005	"Popstar" (Note: Jon's "Popstar" is a cover version of the Sita song, originally written for Britney Spears)	Jon	Today Is a Good Day (To Fall in Love)	Remee, Johan Ekhé, Ulf Lindström
2005	"Over to You Now"	Britney Spears	Britney & Kevin: Chaotic	Guy Sigsworth, Imogen Heap, Alexander Kronlund
2005	"Money for Nothing"	Darin	The Anthem	Remee, Johan Ekhé, Ulf Lindström
2008	"See My Side"	Jordin Sparks	Jordin Sparks	Klas Åhlund, Christian Karlsson, Pontus Winnberg
2009	"Qui est cette fille ?"	Yelle	iTunes Foreign Exchange #2	Karin Dreijer, Alexander Kronlund, Olof Dreijer, Julie Budet

== Music videos ==
=== As lead artist ===
List of music videos as lead artist, showing year released and directors
Title	Year	Director(s)
"You've Got That Somethin'"	1995	Barry Maguire
"Do You Really Want Me (Show Respect)" (first version)	1995	
"Do You Know (What It Takes)" (first version)	1996	
"Do You Know (What It Takes)" (second version)	1996	Kevin Bray
"Show Me Love"	1997	Kevin Bray
"Do You Really Want Me (Show Respect)" (second version)	1998	Francis Lawrence
"Do You Really Want Me (Show Respect)" (Urban Mix)	1998	Francis Lawrence
"Electric"	1999	
"My Only Reason"	1999	
"Keep This Fire Burning"	2002	Didier Kerbrat
"Don't Stop the Music"	2002	Bernard Wedig and Conchita Soares
"Be Mine!" (first version)	2005	Brad Kluck
"Handle Me" (first version)	2005	Fredrik Skogkvist
"Crash and Burn Girl"	2006	Fredrik Skogkvist, Johan Sandberg and Henrik Timonen
"With Every Heartbeat" (first version) (with Kleerup)	2006	Fredrik Skogkvist
"Konichiwa Bitches"	2007	Fredrik Skogkvist, Johan Sandberg and Henrik Timonen
"With Every Heartbeat" (second version) (with Kleerup)	2007	StyleWar
"Handle Me" (second version)	2007	Johan Renck
"Be Mine!" (second version)	2007	Max Vitali
"Who's That Girl"	2008	Diane Martel
"Cobrastyle"	2008	Rankin and Chris Cottam
"Dancing On My Own"	2010	Max Vitali
"Don't Fucking Tell Me What to Do"	2010	Mary Fagot
"Hang with Me"	2010	Max Vitali
"Indestructible"	2010	Nils Ljunggren and Max Vitali
"Dancehall Queen"	2010	Diplo, Red Foxx and Pomp&Clout
"Call Your Girlfriend"	2011	Max Vitali
"U Should Know Better" (featuring Snoop Dogg)	2013	Decida
"Sayit" (with Röyksopp)	2014	Johan Sandberg, Henrik Timonen and Kacper Kasprzyk
"Do It Again" (with Röyksopp)	2014	Martin de Thurah
"Monument" (with Röyksopp)	2014	Max Vitali
"Love Is Free" (with La Bagatelle Magique featuring Maluca)	2015	SSION
"Honey"	2018	Max Vitali
"Send To Robin Immediately"	2019	Max Vitali
"Between The Lines"	2019	SSION and Cody Critcheloe
"Ever Again"	2019	Colin Solal Cardo
"Dopamine"	2025	Marili Andre
"Talk to Me"	2025	Casper Wackerhausen-Sejersen

=== As featured artist ===
List of music videos as featured artist, showing year released and directors
Title	Year	Director(s)
"Dream On" (first version) (Christian Falk featuring Robyn and Ola Salo)	2006	Fredrik Skogkvist and Tobias Annerhult
"Dream On" (second version) (Christian Falk featuring Robyn)	2008	Barnaby Roper
"The Girl and the Robot" (Röyksopp featuring Robyn)	2009	Michael Baldwin
"Caesar" (I Blame Coco featuring Robyn)	2010	Hope Audikana
"Bad Gal" (Savage Skulls and Douster featuring Robyn)	2011	Tim Erem
"Never Will Be Mine" (Rye Rye featuring Robyn)	2011	Tim Nackashi
"Never Will Be Mine" (Kat Krazy Remix) (Rye Rye featuring Robyn)	2011	Tim Nackashi
"Never Will Be Mine" (Burns Remix) (Rye Rye featuring Robyn)	2011	Travis Kopach
"Never Will Be Mine" (R3hab Remix) (Rye Rye featuring Robyn)	2011	Travis Kopach
"Go Kindergarten" (The Lonely Island featuring Robyn, Sean Combs and Paul Rudd)	2013	Akiva Schaffer and Jorma Taccone
"Out of the Black" (Neneh Cherry featuring Robyn)	2014	Dario Vigorito
"Monument" (The Inevitable End Version) (Röyksopp featuring Robyn)	2014	Stian Andersen
"The Hardest Thing to Do" (Tony Primo and Nixxie featuring Joseph Mount from Metronomy and Robyn)	2015	
