= List of awards and nominations received by Robyn =

== Awards and nominations ==
| Award | Year | Nominee(s) | Category | Result | Ref. |
|---|---|---|---|---|---|
| AMFT Awards | 2010 | "Dancing on My Own" | Song of the Year | Won | |
| AMFT Awards | 2010 | "Dancing on My Own" | Record of the Year | Won | |
| AMFT Awards | 2010 | "Dancing on My Own" | Best Dance Recording | Won | |
| AMFT Awards | 2010 | Body Talk Pt. 1 | Best Dance/Electronic Album | Won | |
| AMFT Awards | 2018 | "Honey" | Best Dance Recording | Won | |
| AMFT Awards | 2018 | Honey | Best Dance/Electronic Album | Won | |
| ASCAP Pop Music Awards | 1999 | "Show Me Love" | Most Performed Song | Won | |
| Antville Music Video Awards | 2011 | "Call Your Girlfriend" | Best Performance | Nominated | |
| Antville Music Video Awards | 2011 | "Call Your Girlfriend" | Best Choreography | Nominated | |
| BDSCertified Spin Awards | 2003 | "Show Me Love" | 300,000 Spins | Won | |
| Berlin Music Video Awards | 2015 | "Do It Again" (with Röyksopp) | Best Narrative | Nominated | |
| Billboard Music Video Awards | 1997 | "Do You Know (What It Takes)" | Best New Artist Clip (Dance) | Won | |
| Billboard Music Video Awards | 1997 | "Do You Know (What It Takes)" | Dance Clip of the Year | Nominated | |
| Brit Awards | 2011 | Herself | International Female Solo Artist | Nominated | |
| Capital FM's Awards | 2011 | Herself | Best International Female | Nominated | |
| Classic Pop Reader Awards | 2019 | "Honey" | Single of the Year | Nominated | |
| Danish Music Awards | 2010 | Body Talk Pt. 1 | Foreign Album of the Year | Won | |
| European Festival Awards | 2011 | Herself | Best Headliner | Nominated | |
| European Festival Awards | 2011 | "Dancing on My Own" | Festival Anthem of the Year | Nominated | |
| GAFFA-Prisen Awards | 2010 | Herself | Best International Female Artist | Won | |
| GAFFA-Prisen Awards | 2010 | "Dancing on My Own" | Best International Hit | Won | |
| GAFFA-Prisen Awards | 2010 | "Indestructible" | Best International Video | Nominated | |
| GAFFA-Prisen Awards | 2019 | Honey | Best International Album | Nominated | |
| GAFFA-Prisen Awards | 2019 | Herself | Best International Artist | Nominated | |
| GAFFA-Prisen Awards | 2019 | "Missing U" | Best International Hit | Nominated | |
| GAFFA Awards (Sweden) | 2010 | Herself | Special Award | Won | |
| GAFFA Awards (Sweden) | 2015 | Love is Free (with La Bagatelle Magique) | Dance of the Year | Won | |
| GAFFA Awards (Sweden) | 2019 | Honey | Album of the Year | Won | |
| GAFFA Awards (Sweden) | 2019 | "Honey" | Hit of the Year | Nominated | |
| GAFFA Awards (Sweden) | 2019 | Herself | Solo Artist of the Year | Nominated | |
| GAFFA Awards (Sweden) | 2019 | Herself | Electronic of the Year | Won | |
| Grammy Awards | 2009 | Robyn | Best Dance/Electronica Album | Nominated | |
| Grammy Awards | 2011 | "Dancing on My Own" | Best Dance Recording | Nominated | |
| Grammy Awards | 2012 | "Call Your Girlfriend" | Best Dance Recording | Nominated | |
| Grammy Awards | 2012 | Body Talk Pt. 3 | Best Dance/Electronica Album | Nominated | |
| Grammy Awards | 2015 | Do It Again (with Röyksopp) | Best Dance/Electronic Album | Nominated | |
| Grammy Awards | 2027 | Sexistential | Best Dance/Electronic Album | Pending | |
| Grammis | 1996 | "Do You Really Want Me (Show Respect)" | Song of the Year | Nominated | |
| Grammis | 1996 | Herself | Newcomer of the Year | Nominated | |
| Grammis | 1996 | Herself | Best Female Pop/Rock Artist | Nominated | |
| Grammis | 2000 | Herself | Best Female Pop/Rock Artist | Won | |
| Grammis | 2000 | Herself | Artist of the Year | Nominated | |
| Grammis | 2000 | My Truth | Album of the Year | Nominated | |
| Grammis | 2003 | Don't Stop the Music | Album of the Year | Nominated | |
| Grammis | 2003 | "Keep This Fire Burning" | Song of the Year | Nominated | |
| Grammis | 2003 | Herself | Artist of the Year | Nominated | |
| Grammis | 2003 | Herself | Best Female Pop/Rock Artist | Won | |
| Grammis | 2006 | Herself | Composer of the Year | Won | |
| Grammis | 2006 | Herself | Female Pop Artist of the Year | Nominated | |
| Grammis | 2006 | Herself | Artist of the Year | Nominated | |
| Grammis | 2006 | "Be Mine!" | Song of the Year | Won | |
| Grammis | 2006 | Robyn | Album of the Year | Won | |
| Grammis | 2009 | Herself | Live Act of the Year | Won | |
| Grammis | 2011 | Herself | Artist of the Year | Nominated | |
| Grammis | 2011 | Herself | Female Artist of the Year | Won | |
| Grammis | 2011 | Herself | Composer of the Year | Won | |
| Grammis | 2011 | Herself | Innovator of the Year | Nominated | |
| Grammis | 2011 | Herself | International Success | Nominated | |
| Grammis | 2011 | Body Talk | Album of the Year | Won | |
| Grammis | 2011 | "Dancing on My Own" | Song of the Year | Won | |
| Grammis | 2012 | "Call Your Girlfriend" | Music Video of the Year | Nominated | |
| Grammis | 2014 | "U Should Know Better" | Music Video of the Year | Nominated | |
| Grammis | 2015 | "Monument" (with Röyksopp) | Music Video of the Year | Won | |
| Grammis | 2015 | "Sayit" (with Röyksopp) | Music Video of the Year | Nominated | |
| Grammis | 2019 | Honey | Album of the Year | Nominated | |
| Grammis | 2019 | "Missing U" | Song of the Year | Won | |
| Grammis | 2019 | Herself | Artist of the Year | Nominated | |
| Grammis | 2019 | Herself | Composer of the Year | Nominated | |
| Grammis | 2019 | Herself | Pop of the Year | Won | |
| Hungarian Music Awards | 2026 | "Dopamine" | Foreign Electronic Music Album or Recording of the Year | Won | |
| International Dance Music Awards | 1998 | Herself | Best New Dance Solo Artist | Won | |
| International Dance Music Awards | 2008 | "With Every Heartbeat" | Best Dance Music Video | Nominated | |
| International Dance Music Awards | 2011 | "Dancing on My Own" | Best Commercial Dance Track | Nominated | |
| International Dance Music Awards | 2015 | "Do It Again" (with Röyksopp) | Best Indie Dance Track | Nominated | |
| International Dance Music Awards | 2015 | "Do It Again" (with Röyksopp) | Best Featured Vocalist Performance | Nominated | |
| International Dance Music Awards | 2015 | Herself (with Röyksopp) | Best Artist (Group) | Nominated | |
| KTH Royal Institute of Technology | 2013 | Herself | Great Prize | Won | |
| MTV Europe Music Awards | 1998 | Herself | MTV Select — Northern | Nominated | |
| MTV Europe Music Awards | 2010 | Herself | Best Swedish Act | Nominated | |
| MTV Europe Music Awards | 2011 | Herself | Best Swedish Act | Nominated | |
| MTV Europe Music Awards | 2019 | Herself | Best Swedish Act | Nominated | |
| mtvU Woodie Awards | 2011 | Herself | Performance Woodie | Nominated | |
| Musikexportpriset | 2010 | Herself | Music Export Award | Won | |
| Musikförläggarnas Pris | 2019 | Herself | Best Composer | Nominated | |
| Musikförläggarnas Pris | 2019 | Herself | Best International Success | Nominated | |
| Musikförläggarnas Pris | 2019 | "Missing You" | Best Song | Nominated | |
| Musikförläggarnas Pris | 2021 | Herself | Honorary Award | Won | |
| NME Awards | 2020 | Herself | Songwriter of the Decade | Won | |
| Nordic Music Prize | 2010 | Body Talk | Album of the Year | Nominated | |
| Nordic Music Prize | 2019 | Honey | Album of the Year | Won | |
| Nordic Music Video Awards | 2015 | "Monument" (with Röyksopp) | Best Artist Performance | Nominated | |
| Nordic Music Video Awards | 2015 | "Monument" (with Röyksopp) | Best Post Production | Won | |
| Nordic Music Video Awards | 2015 | "Monument" (with Röyksopp) | Årets Musikkvideo | Nominated | |
| Nordic Music Video Awards | 2015 | "Monument" (The Inevitable End Version) (with Röyksopp) | Årets Musikkvideo | Won | |
| Nordic Music Video Awards | 2015 | "Monument" (The Inevitable End Version) (with Röyksopp) | Best Edit | Won | |
| Nordic Music Video Awards | 2015 | "Monument" (The Inevitable End Version) (with Röyksopp) | Best Director | Nominated | |
| O Music Awards | 2011 | "Dancing on My Own" | Innovative Music Video | Nominated | |
| P3 Gold Awards | 2011 | Herself | Best Pop Artist | Nominated | |
| P3 Gold Awards | 2011 | Herself | Best Artist | Won | |
| P3 Gold Awards | 2011 | Herself | Best Live Act | Won | |
| P3 Gold Awards | 2011 | "Dancing on My Own" | Best Song | Won | |
| P3 Gold Awards | 2016 | Herself | Dance Artist of the Year | Won | |
| P3 Gold Awards | 2019 | Herself | Dance Artist of the Year | Won | |
| P3 Gold Awards | 2019 | Herself | Best Artist | Nominated | |
| P3 Gold Awards | 2023 | Herself | P3 Icon | Won | |
| P3 Gold Awards | 2025 | "Life" (with Jamie xx) | Best Song | Nominated | |
| P3 Gold Awards | 2025 | "360" (with Charli XCX and Yung Lean) | Best Song Quote | Nominated | |
| STIM | 2009 | Herself | Platinagitarren | Won | |
| UK Festival Awards | 2007 | Herself | Festival Pop Act | Nominated | |

== Queerty Awards ==
| Year | Nominee / work | Award | Result | Ref. |
|---|---|---|---|---|
| 2019 | "Missing U" | Anthem | Nominated | |
| 2020 | "Ever Again" | Anthem | Nominated | |

== Rober Awards Music Poll ==
| Year | Nominee / work | Award | Result |
|---|---|---|---|
| 2009 | "The Girl and the Robot" (with Röyksopp) | Best Dance Anthem | Won |
| 2009 | "The Girl and the Robot" (with Röyksopp) | Song of the Year | Nominated |
| 2010 | "Dancing on My Own" | Song of the Year | Won |
| 2010 | Herself | Best Female Artist | Nominated |
| 2010 | Herself | Best Pop Artist | Nominated |
| 2010 | Body Talk Pt. 1 | Best EP | Won |
| 2014 | Do It Again (with Röyksopp) | Best EP | Won |
| 2014 | "Tell Me (Today)" | Best Cover Version | Nominated |
| 2018 | Herself | Best Female Artist | Nominated |
| 2018 | Herself | Best Pop Artist | Nominated |
| 2018 | "Honey" | Floorfiller of the Year | Won |

== Rockbjornen ==
The Rockbjörnen is a music award ceremony in Sweden, established in 1979 by the Aftonbladet, one of the largest newspapers in Nordic countries. Robyn has won a total of four awards.

| Year | Nominee / work | Award | Result |
|---|---|---|---|
| 1995 | Herself | Best Swedish Female Artist | Won |
| 1999 | Herself | Best Swedish Female Artist | Won |
| 2010 | Herself | Best Swedish Female Artist | Won |
| 2010 | Herself | Best Female Live Act | Won |

== Scandipop Awards ==
The Scandipop Awards are an annual British online music award.

| Year | Nominee / work | Award | Result |
|---|---|---|---|
| 2015 | "Do It Again" | Best Electropop | Nominated |
| 2015 | "Monument" (The Inevitable End Version) | Best Electropop | Nominated |

== UK Music Video Awards ==
The UK Music Video Awards is an annual award ceremony founded in 2008 to recognise creativity, technical excellence and innovation in music videos and moving images for music.

| Year | Nominee / work | Award | Result |
|---|---|---|---|
| 2011 | "Call Your Girlfriend" | Best Pop Video - International | Nominated |
| 2013 | "U Should Know Better" (ft. Snoop Dogg) | Best Pop Video - International | Nominated |
| 2017 | "Hang Me Out to Dry" (ft. Metronomy) | Best Alternative Video - UK | Nominated |

== Virgin Media Music Awards ==
The Virgin Media Music Awards is an online music awards group. Robyn has received 1 nomination.

| Year | Nominee / work | Award | Result | Ref. |
|---|---|---|---|---|
| 2007 | "With Every Heartbeat" | Best Track | Nominated | |
| 2010 | Robyn | Best Female | Nominated | |

== World Music Awards ==
The World Music Award is an international awards show founded in 1989 that annually honors recording artists based on worldwide sales figures provided by the International Federation of the Phonographic Industry (IFPI).

| Year | Nominee / work | Award | Result |
|---|---|---|---|
| 2012 | Herself | World's Best Female Artist | Nominated |
| 2012 | Herself | World's Best Entertainer Of The Year | Nominated |
| 2014 | Herself | World's Best Entertainer Of The Year | Nominated |
| 2014 | Herself | World's Best Female Artist | Nominated |
| 2014 | Herself | World's Best Live Act | Nominated |
