= Honey Tour =

2019 concert tour by Robyn

- Tour by Robyn
- Associated album: Honey
- Start date: February 5, 2019
- End date: October 15, 2019
- Legs: 6
- No. of shows: 23 in Europe; 22 in North America; 45 in total

Robyn concert chronology
- Do It Again Tour (2014); Honey Tour (2019); The Sexistential Tour (2026)

The Honey Tour was an international concert tour by Swedish singer Robyn, which supported her eighth studio album Honey (2018). The tour started on February 5, 2019, in Stavanger, Norway and concluded on October 15, 2019, in Irving, United States. It was the singer's first headlining tour since the Body Talk Tour (2010–11).

== Background ==
After releasing her seventh studio album in 2010, titled Body Talk, Robyn went on a hiatus. She released two collaborative EPs, Do It Again with Röyksopp in 2014 and Love Is Free with La Bagatelle Magique in 2015. Robyn then went on to release her eighth studio album Honey on October 26, 2018. The Honey Tour was announced on November 13, 2018. The tour is the singer's first headlining concert tour since the Body Talk Tour in 2010 and 2011, though she went on tour in 2014 to promote the Do It Again EP with Röyksopp.

== Set list ==
This set list is from the February 5, 2019, concert in Stavanger. It is not intended to represent all concerts for the tour.

1. "Send to Robin Immediately"
2. "Honey"
3. "Indestructible"
4. "Hang with Me"
5. "Beach2k20"
6. "Ever Again"
7. "Be Mine!"
8. "Because It's in the Music"
9. "Between the Lines"
10. "Love Is Free"
11. "Don't Fucking Tell Me What to Do"
12. "Dancing on My Own"
13. "Missing U"
14. "Call Your Girlfriend"

Encore I

15. "Human Being"
16. "With Every Heartbeat"
17. "Who Do You Love?"

Encore II

18. "Stars 4-Ever"

== Tour dates ==
List of concerts, showing date, city, country, venue, opening acts, tickets sold, number of available tickets and amount of gross revenue
| Date | City | Country | Venue | Opening acts |
Leg 1 — Europe
| February 5, 2019 | Stavanger | Norway | Stavanger Konserthus | —N/a |
| February 6, 2019 | Bergen | Norway | Usf Røkeriet | —N/a |
| February 8, 2019 | Malmö | Sweden | Malmö Live | —N/a |
| February 9, 2019 | Gothenburg | Sweden | Gothenburg Studios | —N/a |
Leg 2 — North America
| February 22, 2019 | Los Angeles | United States | Hollywood Palladium | —N/a |
| February 23, 2019 | Los Angeles | United States | Hollywood Palladium | —N/a |
| February 25, 2019 | Oakland | United States | Fox Oakland Theatre | —N/a |
| February 26, 2019 | Oakland | United States | Fox Oakland Theatre | —N/a |
| February 28, 2019 (Note: The concert of February 28, 2019 at the Pacific Coliseum in Vancouver was originally scheduled to take place at the PNE Forum, but moved due to high ticket demand) | Vancouver | Canada | Pacific Coliseum | —N/a |
| March 1, 2019 | Seattle | United States | Paramount Theatre | —N/a |
| March 5, 2019 | Saint Paul | United States | Palace Theatre | —N/a |
| March 6, 2019 (Note: The concert of March 6, 2019 at the Aragon Ballroom in Chicago was originally scheduled to take place at the Riviera Theatre, but moved due to high ticket demand) | Chicago | United States | Aragon Ballroom | —N/a |
| March 8, 2019 | New York City | United States | Madison Square Garden | —N/a |
| March 9, 2019 | Washington, D.C. | United States | The Anthem | —N/a |
| March 11, 2019 | Boston | United States | House of Blues | —N/a |
| March 13, 2019 | Montreal | Canada | M Telus | —N/a |
| March 14, 2019 | Toronto | Canada | Rebel | —N/a |
Leg 3 — Europe
| April 3, 2019 | Munich | Germany | Tonhalle | —N/a |
| April 5, 2019 | Cologne | Germany | Palladium | —N/a |
| April 6, 2019 | Berlin | Germany | Velodrom | —N/a |
| April 8, 2019 | Hamburg | Germany | Mehr! Theater | —N/a |
| April 9, 2019 | Paris | France | l'Olympia | —N/a |
| April 12, 2019 | London | England | Alexandra Palace | —N/a |
| April 13, 2019 | London | England | Alexandra Palace | —N/a |
| May 31, 2019 (Note: This concert is a part of Primavera Sound.) | Barcelona | Spain | Parc del Fòrum | —N/a |
| June 26, 2019 (Note: This concert was originally scheduled to take place on April 10, 2019 at Melkweg, but was postponed due to unforeseen logistical issues.) | Amsterdam | Netherlands | AFAS Live | —N/a |
| June 28, 2019 (Note: This concert is a part of Rock Werchter.) | Werchter | Belgium | Werchter Festival Grounds | —N/a |
| July 3, 2019 (Note: This concert is a part of Open'er Festival.) | Gdynia | Poland | Gdynia-Kosakowo Airport | —N/a |
| July 5, 2019 (Note: This concert is a part of Roskilde Festival.) | Roskilde | Denmark | Festivalpladsen | —N/a |
| July 7, 2019 (Note: This concert is a part of Down the Rabbit Hole.) | Beuningen | Netherlands | Groene Heuvels | —N/a |
| July 11, 2019 (Note: This concert is a part of NOS Alive.) | Lisbon | Portugal | Passeio Marítimo de Algés | —N/a |
| July 13, 2019 (Note: This concert is a part of Mad Cool Festival.) | Madrid | Spain | Espacio Mad Cool | —N/a |
Leg 4 — North America
| July 17, 2019 | Philadelphia | United States | Mann Center | ESG |
| July 19, 2019 | Brooklyn | United States | Barclays Center | ESG |
| July 21, 2019 (Note: This concert is a part of Pitchfork Music Festival.) | Chicago | United States | Union Park | —N/a |
| July 25, 2019 | San Francisco | United States | Bill Graham Civic Auditorium | Troye Sivan |
| July 27, 2019 | Inglewood | United States | The Forum | Troye Sivan |
Leg 5 — Europe
| August 3, 2019 (Note: This concert is a part of Wilderness Festival.) | Charlbury | England | Cornbury Park | —N/a |
| August 9, 2019 (Note: This concert is a part of Øyafestivalen.) | Oslo | Norway | Tøyen Park | —N/a |
| August 11, 2019 (Note: This concert is a part of Flow Festival.) | Helsinki | Finland | Suvilahti | —N/a |
| August 17, 2019 (Note: This concert is a part of Smash Fest.) | Stockholm | Sweden | Sjöhistoriska | —N/a |
Leg 6 — North America
| October 8, 2019 | Detroit | United States | Detroit Masonic Temple | ESG |
| October 10, 2019 | Columbus | United States | Express Live! | ESG |
| October 13, 2019 (Note: This concert is a part of Austin City Limits Music Festival.) | Austin | United States | Zilker Park | —N/a |
| October 15, 2019 | Irving | United States | Toyota Music Factory | ESG |

== Cancelled shows ==
| Date | City | Country | Venue | Reason |
|---|---|---|---|---|
| June 5, 2020 (Note: This concert is a part of NorthSide Festival.) | Aarhus | Denmark | Ådalen Aarhus | COVID-19 pandemic |
| June 10, 2020 (Note: This concert is a part of Bergenfest.) | Bergen | Norway | Bergenhus Fortress | COVID-19 pandemic |
| June 13, 2020 (Note: This concert is a part of Lovebox Festival.) | London | England | Gunnersbury Park | COVID-19 pandemic |
| June 14, 2020 (Note: This concert is a part of Parklife Festival.) | Manchester | England | Heaton Park | COVID-19 pandemic |
| June 26, 2020 (Note: This concert is a part of Glastonbury Festival.) | Pilton | England | Worthy Farm | COVID-19 pandemic |
| August 15, 2020 (Note: This concert is a part of Way Out West.) | Gothenburg | Sweden | Slottsskogen | COVID-19 pandemic |
| October 17, 2020 (Note: This concert is a part of III Points Festival. This concert was originally scheduled to May 2, 2020, but was rescheduled due to the COVID-19 pandemic.) | Miami | United States | Mana Wynwood Convention Center | COVID-19 pandemic |
