= Ever Again =

Single by Robyn

from the album Honey
- Released: 17 June 2019
- Genre: Dance-pop; synth-pop; disco
- Length: 4:24
- Label: Konichiwa
- Songwriters: Robyn; Joseph Mount
- Producer: Mount

Robyn singles chronology
"Between the Lines" (2019)	"Ever Again" (2019)	"Beach 2k20" (2019)

Music video
- "Ever Again" on YouTube

"Ever Again" is a song by Swedish singer-songwriter Robyn from her eighth studio album, Honey. She wrote it with its producer, Joseph Mount. Written during a period when Robyn had grown exhausted from working on the album, it was one of the last tracks completed for Honey. The song was released as the album's fourth single on 17 June 2019 by Konichiwa Records.

"Ever Again" is a dance-pop, synth-pop, and disco song. Performed over a distinct bassline, loudening synths, and layered harmonies, it draws inspiration from 1980s music, R&B, funk, and a range of pop and rock genres. Many critics have likened it to the work of musician Prince. Although Robyn said the song is about defiance, critics have interpreted its lyrics as a declaration to distance herself from the heartbreak themes that have defined much of her work. "Ever Again" received positive reviews, with many critics highlighting it as one of the strongest tracks on the album and, as Honey's closing track, praising its role as the finale. In the United States, the song peaked at number 31 on the Billboard Hot Dance/Electronic Songs chart.

Colin Solal Cardo directed the music video for "Ever Again", which was released the same day as the single. In the video, Robyn suggestively dances with a microphone stand on a sand-filled sound stage, surrounded by Greek mythology-inspired statues and ruins. The video was praised for Robyn's dancing. Robyn promoted the song with live performances on The Ellen DeGeneres Show and The Late Show with Stephen Colbert, and has included "Ever Again" on her Honey Tour (2019) and The Sexistential Tour (2026) set lists.

== Background and release ==
Swedish singer Robyn wrote "Ever Again" with Joseph Mount, who also produced the track. The pair wrote it near the end of completing her eighth studio album, Honey, during a period when Robyn said she had grown exhausted from working on the album and felt they deserved a break. Mount began playing what would become the song's chords on his synthesizer, which Robyn liked and worked with him to refine. Subsequently, the chorus came to them quickly. Robyn and Mount finished the song in one night, and the latter considers it to be his favorite song on Honey. Robyn contrasted the ease of writing "Ever Again" against the rest of the album's creative process, saying, "It was so nice to write something at the end of making the record where you have the whole thing in your system and you can add to it in this very natural way".

Mount co-wrote and produced much of Honey with Robyn, but his influence is particularly pronounced on "Ever Again". He also played electric guitar on the track, with Ulf Engström playing bass guitar. Audio engineer Neal H Pogue, who mixed the track, said he used the Ozone 8 plugin on the stereo bus to apply subtle equalization and compression, enhancing the song's overall balance and clarity while evoking a vintage sound inspired by 1980s music. He also identified "Ever Again" as his favorite song from Honey. Most of the tracks on Honey were sequenced in the order they were written, with "Ever Again", being one of the final songs composed, ultimately closing the album.

In September 2018, Robyn revealed the track list for her then-upcoming album Honey in an animated clip posted on social media, confirming "Ever Again" as its ninth and final track. The song was released as the album's fourth single on 17 June 2019 by Konichiwa Records. Three official remixes of "Ever Again", by Planningtorock, Soulwax, and Patrick Topping, were released on 9 July 23 August, and 4 October 2019, respectively. On 20 June 2020, the song was issued as a limited edition 12-inch vinyl featuring remixes, as part of a Honey remix series released for Love Record Store Day 2020, alongside "Honey", "Baby Forgive Me", and "Between the Lines / Beach2k20". Only 500 copies of each record were manufactured.

In 2026, Robyn revealed that she wrote "Ever Again" after reconciling with her partner, videographer Max Vitali. The pair broke up again shortly before her tour, and Robyn said performing the song live became embarrassing because it represented a promise that their relationship would be different.

== Music and lyrics ==
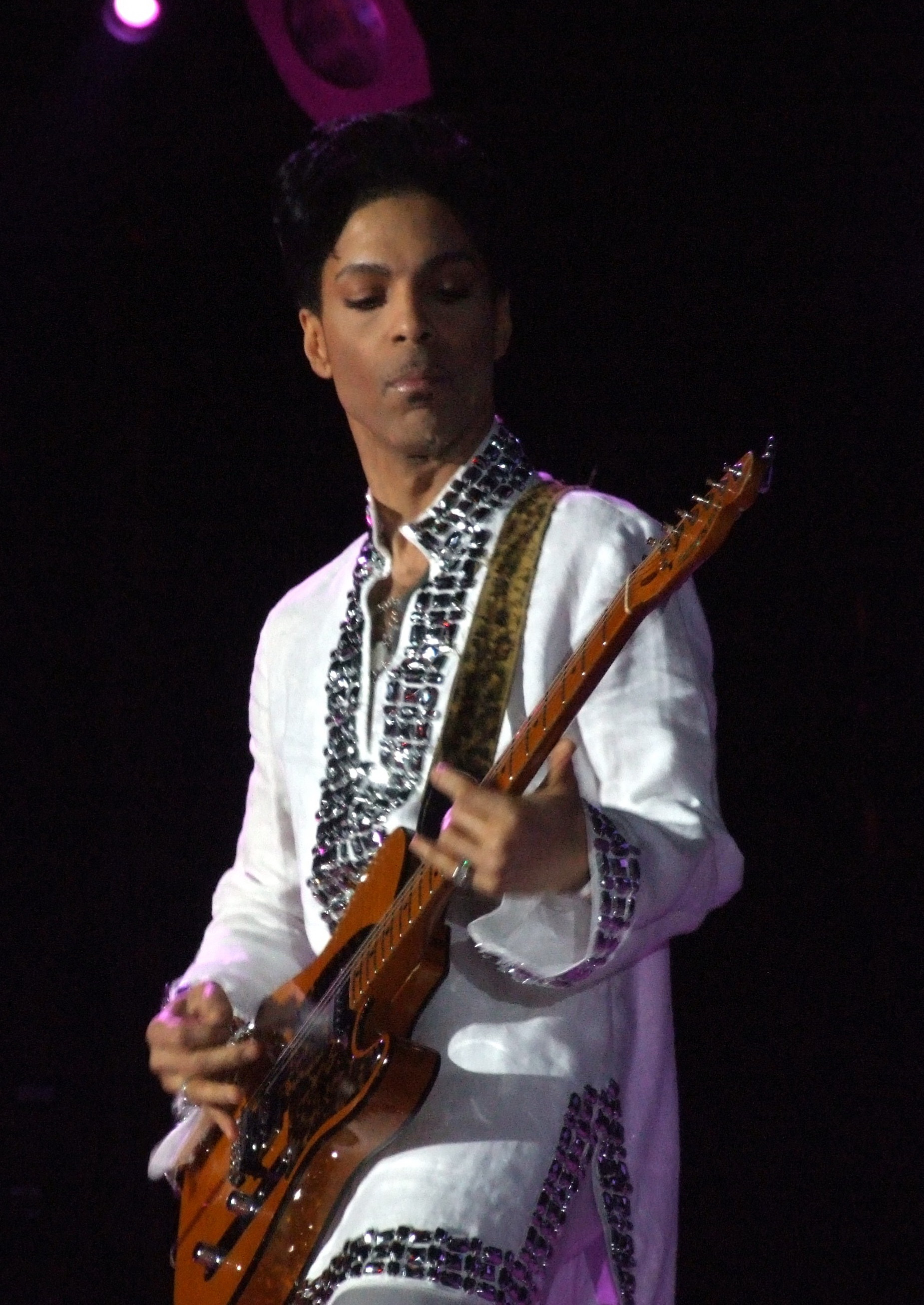
Music critics compared "Ever Again" to the work of singer Prince.

"Ever Again" is an R&B-tinged dance-pop, synth-pop, and disco song with an "undulating groove ... atmospheric instrumentation and empowering lyrics", according to Paste's Harry Todd. It is four minutes and twenty-four seconds (4:24) long, and performed in the key of E major at 125 beats per minute. A mid-tempo track with a distinct, syncopated bassline, the song incorporates retro synths, 1980s influences, and layered vocal harmonies, over a pulse-pounding rhythm. Critics have identified synth-rock, space rock, yacht rock, new wave, funk, synth funk, and future funk elements in its production, with Samuel Murrian of Instinct labeling it an "electronic track" with "a definitive rock-guitar edge". Building gradually, its ending crescendos into a synth explosion, approximately three minutes into the track. Musically, it contrasts much of the album's club energy. Variety's Jem Aswad summarized "Ever Again" as the album's most straightforward pop song. Nolan Feeney of Billboard and Natasha Lewis of the Nation noted that "Ever Again" departs from Honey's experimental sound in favor of the more mainstream dance-pop style of Robyn's earlier work, comparing it to her 2005 self-titled album and Body Talk (2010), respectively. Several journalists likened "Ever Again" to the work of musician Prince, and agreed that its production is also heavily inspired by Mount's own band, Metronomy. Raúl Guillén of Jenesaispop theorized that the song's bassline likely draws from both artists, while Prince's influence is more evident in its keyboards, guitars, and background vocals. After comparing the song to other artists, Ruth Cronin of GoldenPlec credits the "influx of synths" with restoring "Ever Again" "back into Robyn territory". Ticketmaster Discover's Ben Jolley called it "a sonic embodiment of the lights coming back on after a very fun night out" and "funkier sister" to Robyn's "Between the Lines" (2019).

"Ever Again" uses optimistic lyrics to convey the singer's intentions to only sing about love henceforth. Her vocals evoke a range of emotions, delivering lines such as "daddy issues and silly games" with a scoff. In a review for The Independent, Helen Brown compared her vocal delivery to singer Cyndi Lauper, and God Is in the TV's Jonathan Wright found the sweetness in Robyn's voice reminiscent of her own single "Be Mine" (2005). Courtney E. Smith of Refinery29 said the song's happy, danceable beat contradicts its lyrics, which describe "the push and pull of a new relationship", per Matt Gallatin of The Michigan Daily. According to Robyn, "Ever Again" is "a defiant song about standing up for yourself", although she welcomes other interpretations. Alexis Petridis of The Guardian said it is "about surviving by shutting oneself down emotionally". Several critics have interpreted the song as Robyn declaring that she will no longer be defined by heartbreak, a theme often associated with her career, particularly via its chorus "never going to be brokenhearted ever again". Referring to feeling brokenhearted, she announces "that shit's out the door". Stephen Keegan of Hot Press said the singer "addresses her position as the queen of dancefloor tearjerkers". Writers for Entertainment Weekly, Billboard, and The Guardian lamented the implication that Robyn might never again release music about heartbreak, with Laura Snapes of The Guardian comparing the idea to if singer Adele decided to stop singing breakup songs. Will Hermes of Rolling Stone called it "an absurd declaration", but agreed "sometimes these are the things we need to tell ourselves to keep going". Douglas Greenwood of Highsnobiety acknowledged that Robyn may already be aware of the unpredictability of making such a bold promise but is choosing to deprioritize pain for the first time. The singer explained that while it's impossible to guarantee that one will never experience heartbreak again, her lyrics could be interpreted about deciding to not let heartbreak destroy you, rather than avoiding it altogether.

Several critics discussed the song's meaning in relation to the broader themes of Honey. Caryn Ganz of the New York Times labeled "Ever Again" a song that could be interpreted either literally or ironically, and thematically a "salve" to the album's earlier songs about trauma. Tasbeeh Herwees of Elle grouped it into Honey's songs about "a re-emergence from grief". Many analysts observed that the track resolves the album on an uncharacteristically hopeful tone, sounding like Robyn has recovered from a difficult period or rebuilt her life. BBC News Online music reporter Mark Savage called the decision to end a Robyn project with a happy song "totally unexpected", and a writer for the Strathclyde Telegraph labeled it "equal parts heart-wrenching and life-affirming". Josh Madrid of The California Aggie and George Fenwick of The New Zealand Herald both noted that, between the album's opening track, "Missing U", and "Ever Again", Robyn completes a journey of personal agency, emerging ready to approach future relationships and strengthen herself for future challenges.

== Reception ==
"Ever Again" received positive reviews for its composition and production. The week of 26 October 2018, Florence Johannot of L'Officiel USA selected "Ever Again" as one of the magazine's best new music releases for its "low-key yet up-tempo electro beats" and "Robyn's dreamy pitch". Will Hodgkinson, a chief music critic for The Times, said "Ever Again" reminds listeners how special Robyn is, and The Daily Telegraph's chief music critic Neil McCormick called it "delightfully buoyant". Stephen Keegan of Hot Press deemed it an earworm. Mel Fisher of Louisville Public Media singled out "Ever Again" as "one of the reasons" the publication "loved" its parent album. Paste's Ellen Johnson said "It's frankly impossible not to feel inspired or hopeful when you hear" the chorus. Niall O'Shaughnessy of the College Tribune said "Ever Again"'s bassline alone deserves a 12-minute remix. Claire Biddles of The Line of Best Fit complimented Robyn's ability to translate "Ever Again"'s repetitive refrain into "deep-set conviction".

Several critics agreed that "Ever Again" is one of the best songs on Honey, with Jael Goldfine of Paper naming it the album's "Must Listen". Luke Bonner of KRUI-FM identified "Ever Again" as his favorite track, which he believes represents "a turning point for Robyn". Jagoda Waszkowiak of the Courier called it a great song that lyrically stands out from the other tracks on Honey. Some critics, such as Natasha Lewis of the Nation and Jia Tolentino of the New Yorker, also identified the song as among the Honey tracks that most strongly reflect Robyn's signature sound. A writer for Sputnikmusic remarked that "Ever Again" is "The closest thing you'll find on Honey to the music on Body Talk". A writer for Beat said "In true Robyn fashion, it is an anthem, a stand out track if ever there was one, with a perfect bassline to see Honey out". Matt Gallatin of the Michigan Daily declared the song a triumph in the context of both the album and Robyn's overall career, expounding, "After eight years of battling pain and loss at the fault of love, she doesn't say that she'll never love again — she says she'll never 'hurt' again".

Many reviewers complimented the song's placement as the album's final track, such as Annabel Ross of Resident Advisor, who dubbed it "a sublime finale". Matthew Neale of Clash praised "That shit's out the door" as a "wonderful" closing lyric, while Adam Weddle of Paste deemed it a "standout closer". Katie Hawthorne of the Skinny described its synth-driven crescendo, which accounts for the album's last 90 seconds, as "The breakdown we've been waiting for". For Exclaim!, Ian Gormely called the track both a standout and "rejuvenating closer". Stereoboard's Jacob Brookman wished more albums would subvert expectations like Honey by ending with a "potential hit", and described "Ever Again" as deserving of being a primary single. Dan Condon of ABC News agreed that placing the album's "most immediate pop gem" at the end of the album was subversive, and hoped that "anyone who is listening to this as a full piece of work doesn't bail out early". The Knoxville News Sentinel's Chuck Campbell referred to it as "an irresistible call for conflict resolution". The Strathclyde Telegraph reviewed "Ever Again" as a perfect track "that represent[s] a very singular moment in time, one only heartbroken people get the privilege of experiencing". For Variety's Jem Aswad, "Ever Again" is "a perfect sendoff to an album that's both challenging and familiar, and a chorus [Robyn] probably knew listeners would have echoing in their heads long after Honey ends".

Billboard's Andrew Unterberger and Joe Lynch disagreed on the track. While Unterberger declared it "the pure pop injection we've been waiting for", Lynch called it "an outlier" on the album. Mathew Rodriguez of Into said that "Ever Again" risks making Honey's ending sound "a little disjointed". The song was placed at number 33 on Rolling Stone's ranking of 2018's 50 best songs. The Atlantic's Spencer Kornhaber named "Ever Again" one of the year's "27 Best Music Moments". Alexis Petridis of the Guardian ranked "Ever Again" the fourth-best song of Robyn's career. Ticketmaster Discover ranked it the eighth-best song in Robyn's discography, and Jenesaispop ranked it 19th. Spotify named it one of the 100 Greatest Pop Songs of the Streaming Era, at number 70.

== Commercial performance ==
"Ever Again" charted at number 22 in Sweden, number 31 on the US Billboard Hot Dance/Electronic Songs chart, and number 38 on the Ultratip Bubbling Under chart in Flanders. When it debuted on the US Billboard Hot Dance/Electronic Songs chart in November 2018, "Ever Again" became the third of four songs from Honey to appear on the chart. By June 2019, "Ever Again" had already amassed more Spotify streams than the album's title track.

== Music video ==
=== Background ===
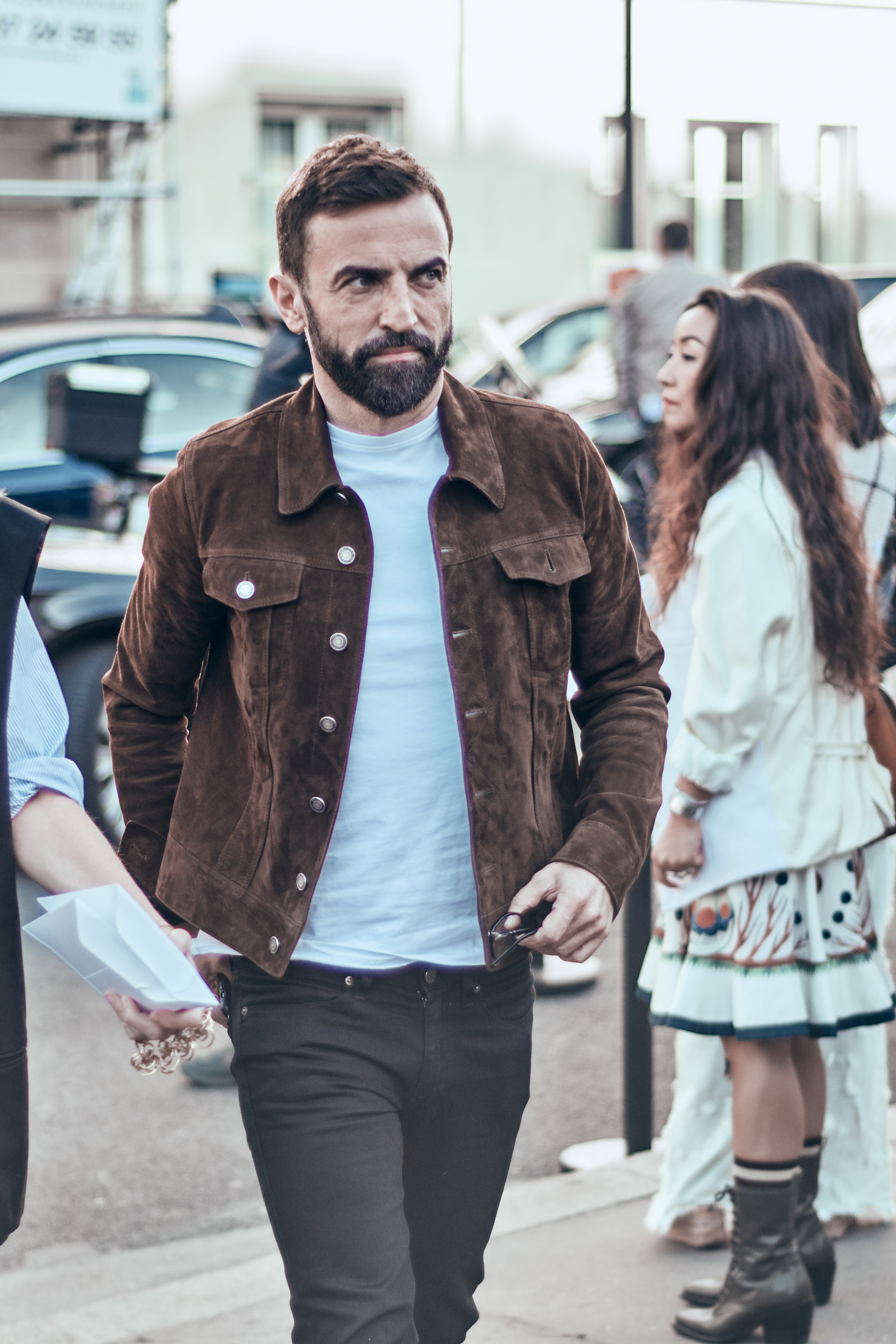
Nicolas Ghesquière designed the removable blouse Robyn wears in the "Ever Again" music video.

The music video for "Ever Again" was directed by Colin Solal Cardo and choreographed by Maria "Decida" Wahlberg. Robyn had worked with Wahlberg on several of her previous music videos, including "Dancing On My Own" (2010) and "Call Your Girlfriend" (2011). Cardo had interpreted "Ever Again" as a song about reclaiming one's sexuality amidst heartbreak, and wanted its video to appear classic and theatrical, "but also raw and desperately alive, full of lust and energy". According to Cardo, Robyn offered to perform nude if necessary, but the director suggested different approach. Robyn and Wahlberg discussed how to move with a microphone, often FaceTiming each other while holding a microphone stand. Once together in the studio, they rehearsed the choreography. They drew inspiration from 1980s artists whose stage presence they admired, including Freddie Mercury, Def Leppard, Steven Tyler, Bobby Brown, and Prince. They also considered how to execute the choreography without objectifying female sexuality, noting that few women had previously performed this style of movement. To achieve reflecting the song's combination of heartbreak and seduction simultaneously in the choreography, Wahlberg and Robyn discussed how to maneuver one's body in a sexual manner without resorting to clichés, specifically as a woman. Ultimately, the director found Robyn's actions to be empowering rather than objectifying.

For the video, Robyn wears a silk blouse and latex jumpsuit, which were custom-made by Louis Vuitton's Nicolas Ghesquière. Ghesquière's design was inspired by musicians such as Prince and Axl Rose, as well as Mozart, per Robyn's request. Robyn attended two fittings with Ghesquière in Paris, France, where she explained her vision for a costume that could be removed during the performance. Ghesquière sewed magnets into the top, allowing the singer to remove it easily. 3D printed lace was added to the garment, which the designer had never constructed before. Robyn did not have time to rehearse wearing the final costume. She used one of her own flannel shirts instead, but ultimately found that Ghesquière's creation was easier to remove than her own clothing.

"Ever Again" was filmed on a cyclorama soundstage, which was filled with 10 tonnes of sand. Tianès Montasser edited the video as though it were a live performance, synchronizing all footage on a single timeline and opting to emphasize continuity instead of rapid, multi-scene cuts. He said this "provided structure that then allowed for creative freedom in the fine tuning, where the music and Robyn's performance could be highlighted". The music video was released on 17 June 2019, the same day as the single. Robyn announced the video via her social media accounts. A behind-the-scenes video was also uploaded to Robyn's website.

=== Synopsis and reception ===
The music video stars only Robyn. Located in a barren landscape she described as "a dreamy place, somewhere undefined, somewhere in my unconsciousness", she is surrounded by various ruined statues resembling Greek mythology. David Renshaw of The Fader likened it to "the ruins of an ancient civilization". Some critics found her choreography to be reminiscent of Prince, while others said it recalls the music video for "Call Your Girlfriend". Robyn wears a Louis Vuitton bodysuit, which camouflages among the statues. She dances with her microphone stand, which she treats as both a dance partner and lover. Among her interpretive dance moves, she wraps herself around the microphone stand, maneuvers it around her body, and drops, catches, dips, and dives with it. Jael Goldfine of Paper likened her dancing to "secret footage of a kid singing into a hairbrush". As the video continues, her dance moves grow more aggressive and sexual. She slowly strips out of the blouse to reveal a semi-sheer embossed latex jumpsuit, which exposes her nipples. The outfit becomes stained with sand as she dances in it. The sun rises and sets in the background, the color of which also changes as she performs. The shift in lighting reveals the video's set, contrasting modern production elements such as spotlights and green screens with its Hellenic-inspired décor.

Reception towards the video was positive. Robin Murray of Clash said the video "seems to encapsulate what makes 'Honey' era Robyn so riveting". Ben Kaye of Consequence praised Robyn's dance moves and said the video proves she "is one of pop's finest, rarest treasures". Alim Kheraj of i-D said few pop stars "could get away with dancing around dressed like a Jacobean peasant before stripping off and getting intimate with a microphone stand on a sandy floor. But then, there aren't many popstars like Robyn". Chris Azzopardi, a writer for Pride Source, said her dancing reinforces "Robyn's status as a singular supernova still staking out her own slice of solitary sky in a galaxy of flashy pop stars". Samuel R. Murrian of Instinct described it as "minimalist, confident, edgy, and kind of glorious", like its parent album, and DIY called her performance "mesmerising". Rolling Stone named it one of the best music videos of 2018, and Business Insider ranked it 16th out of 57 in a similar listicle. Claire Shaffer, author of the Rolling Stone article, said the video continues to establish Cardo as "one of the best emerging video directors right now", calling it on par with his work for other artists. In 2021, L'Officiel USA included "Ever Again" among "10 Music Videos that Shaped Fashion".

== Live performances ==
Robyn performed "Ever Again" live for the first time on a 22 February 2019 episode of The Ellen DeGeneres Show. At the time, "Ever Again" had not yet been released as a single, with Robyn opting to perform an album track over Honey's existing singles. The winter-themed performance was decorated in a frosty, foggy backdrop, with the singer's band wearing matching white-silver costumes. Robyn herself wore a metallic silver dress. Tom Breihan of Stereogum praised the performance, saying Robyn delivered "a gymnastic, emotional vocal performance" that showcased her charisma. On 12 March 2019, Robyn performed the song on The Late Show with Stephen Colbert, wearing a maroon leather pantsuit on the red-hued stage. Towards the end of her set, she removed the suit and danced. Breihan noted that the Colbert performance was less theatrical than Ellen's, but still "shows just how masterful a performer Robyn is". Of the Colbert performance, Emily Zemler from Rolling Stone said the singer "gave it her all, her emotive expressions clear on the large screens behind the stage". In September 2019, Robyn performed "Ever Again" during her a climate demonstration in Kungsträdgården in Stockholm, Sweden.

The song was included in the set list of her Honey Tour (2019). Some performances of "Ever Again" featured a guitarist performing a guitar solo center stage. Inspired by some of her favorite artists, Robyn decided to reuse some of Wahlberg's choreography from the music video in the live performances to establish that both the video and tour belonged to the same world. On 19 November 2025, Robyn performed "Ever Again" at the Fonda Theatre during her "An Evening With Robyn" concert. It was her first full headlining concert since 2019. Beginning in 2026, Robyn included "Ever Again" in the setlist for The Sexistential Tour. Reviewing her performance at the ING Arena in Brussels, Belgium, Vincent Van Peer of De Morgen identified it as one of the songs that sounded better live than on her albums. She also performed "Ever Again" as part of her setlist while serving as the opening act for the first leg of singer Harry Styles' Together, Together tour.

== Track listing ==
Digital download and stream
No.	Title	Length
1.	"Ever Again" (single mix)	4:23

Planningtorock Remix
No.	Title	Length
1.	"Ever Again" (Planningtorock Remix)	3:33

Soulwax Remix
No.	Title	Length
1.	"Ever Again" (Soulwax Remix)	7:14

Patrick Topping Remix
No.	Title	Length
1.	"Ever Again" (Patrick Topping Remix)	6:15
2.	"Ever Again" (Patrick Topping Dub)	6:20
3.	"Ever Again" (Patrick Topping Remix Edit)	4:00

Limited Edition 12" vinyl
No.	Title	Length
1.	"Ever Again" (Planningtorock Remix)	3:33
2.	"Ever Again" (Planningtorock Extended Remix)	6:26
3.	"Ever Again" (Soulwax Remix)	7:14
4.	"Ever Again" (Patrick Topping Remix)	6:15
Total length:		23:28

== Personnel ==
Credits adapted from the liner notes of Honey.

- Robyn – vocals, vocal arranging, songwriting, vocal recording
- Joseph Mount – electric guitar, vocal arranging, songwriting, production, vocal recording
- Ulf Engström – bass guitar
- David Jones – studio assistance
- NealHPogue – mixing
- Mike Bozzi – mastering

== Charts ==
Chart (2018)	Peak position
Belgium (Ultratip Bubbling Under Flanders)	38
Sweden (Sverigetopplistan)	22
US Hot Dance/Electronic Songs (Billboard)	31
