= Mathis Picard =

French-Malagasy pianist, composer, bandleader

- Born: 30 May 1995 (age 31); Grenoble, France
- Education: Juilliard School (BMus)
- Occupations: pianist, composer, bandleader
- Website: www.mathispicard.com

Mathis Picard (born May 30, 1995) is a French-Malagasy pianist, composer, producer, and bandleader.

An ASCAP Next Generation of Songwriters recipient, Picard runs The Sound Orchestra, which released their debut EP World Unity in 2020. Picard then released his first solo piano album Live at the Museum (2022) which was recorded at the National Jazz Museum of Harlem. Continuing with a U.S. tour, Picard released Live at Blue Llama (2022) and Mysticism of Money: Fugue in D Minor (2022). His latest studio album, Heat of the Moment (2023) received a 5-star review from the Times and is accompanied by a live version Live at the Royal Room (2024) recorded in Seattle, Washington.

== Early life and education ==
Born in France to a French father and Malagasy mother, Mathis Picard first sat at the piano at age three while living with his family in Pittsburgh, Pennsylvania. He began his formal education at the Pittsburgh Suzuki Academy from 1999 to 2000 and continued on to the Conservatoire at Fontainebleau 2001-2002, to the Centre de Musique Didier Lockwood from 2003 to 2005, and the Chetham’s School of Music, in Manchester England from 2006 to 2012. While studying at Chetham's, Picard became the youngest ever finalist of the Montreux Jazz Competition at age ten. He was named a “rising star” by the Scotsman magazine one month later. NWJazzworks published his composition “Why Don't You See?” in the Real Book North West. At the same time he was commissioned by the Northern Chamber Orchestra for his first orchestral piece for Jazz Trio and Orchestra, “Akire,” and was featured in Jazzwise for his composition “Bird Like.”

Picard graduated from the Juilliard School with a Bachelor of Music in 2016 under the mentorship of Kenny Barron.

== Career ==
=== New York City 2016-2020 ===
Mathis featured on Wynton Marsalis's “Young Stars Of Jazz” concert at Jazz At Marciac in France, August 2016.

From 2016 to 2020 Mathis cemented himself on the New York Jazz scene, performing regularly at Dizzy’s Jazz Club Jazz At Lincoln Center with his Orchestra and Smalls Jazz Club, Birdland (New York jazz club) and also played a Smalls Jazz Club residency with collaborators Kyle Poole and Russell Hall. Mathis toured the United States with Bria Skonberg.

In 2017, Mathis frequently collaborated with Kindness (musician) which led to performances on Something Like A War (2019) and Honey (Robyn album).

=== Solo Career 2020-Present ===
Picard's first major project as a bandleader was to found The Sound Orchestra (formerly called the Mathis Sound Orchestra), an 11-piece ensemble that has performed at NuBlu and Dizzy's Club in New York City and the Black Cat in San Francisco. The group released their debut album World Unity (2020) on Outside in Music Records to positive reviews, including All About Jazz, which called Picard “a fascinating name to follow in any context.” Picard was named an ASCAP Next Generation of Songwriters Recipient in 2021.

In January 2022, Picard released Live at the Museum (2022) a recording of a live performance at the National Jazz Museum in Harlem. Downbeat praised Picard, who explores his multidisciplinary musical upbringing in the album, for his “brilliant classical technique and [a] vivid imagination.” He continued on to tour a dozen US venues as a solo artist, recording Live at Blue Llama (2022), a 3-track live EP recorded at Blue LLama Jazz Club, and Mysticism of Money: Fugue in D Minor a music video in collaboration with NPR Music Live Sessions and WRTI 90.1 for International Jazz Day. In the summer, Picard gave a solo piano tour of Europe, which included an artist residency at the Umbria Jazz Festival.

Heat of the Moment (2023), released under LA Reserve, features artists including Melanie Charles, Joel Ross, Braxton Cook, and Vuyo Sotashe. The album was given a 5-star review by the Times, and its warm reception led Picard to record a live trio version at the Royal Room in Seattle, Washington. Live at the Royal Room (2024) features Picard in trio with Jonathan Pinson and Parker McAllister.

In 2025, Picard took his trio to Asia, headlining Hong Kong Pop CultureFest's ImagineLand 2025 and taping a live concert at Seongsu Art Hall in Seoul, South Korea.

In 2026 Mathis, released his first book of Preludes & Fugues. For International Jazz Day 2026, Mathis moderated a discussion and led a performance at The United Nations in New York City organized by Jazz House Kidz & WGBO Radio.

== Collaborators ==
In addition to the Sound Orchestra and his solo work. Picard has performed or recorded with Ron Carter, Wynton Marsalis, Christian McBride, Lillias White, Cyrille Aimee, Cecile McLorin Salvant, Braxton Cook, Benny Benack III, Andre DeSheilds, Veronica Swift, Herlin Riley, Etienne Charles, Kindness (musician), and Lee Ritenour. Picard performs in a trio with Jonathan Pinson and Parker McAllister.

== Discography ==
=== As Leader ===
- Midnight Drummer (JAONA Alias)(Origami Records, 2014)
- World Unity (Outside in Music, 2020)
- Live At The Museum (Outside in Music, 2022)
- Live At Blue Llama (EP) (Blue Llama Records, 2023)
- Heat Of The Moment (LaReserve Records, 2024)
- Preludes & Fugues (LaReserve Records, 2026)
- Mathis Picard & The Sound Orchestra (LaReserve Records, 2026)

=== Braxton Cook ===
- Somewhere In Between (Fresh Selects, 2017)
- No Doubt (Braxton Cook Music, 2018)
- Not Everyone Can Go (Nettwerk Music Group, 2025)

=== The Rongetz Foundation ===
- Noctantropes & Folk Songs (Brooklyn Butterfly Sounds, 2016)
- Alphabet City Music (Brooklyn Butterfly Sounds, 2017)

=== Other Artists ===
- Adison Evans - Hero (CD Baby, 2015)
- C R O W N - Episcene (Ropeadope, 2019)
- Kindness (musician) Something Like A War (Female Energy, 2019)
- Russell Hall - The Feeling Of Romance 2019
- Mwenso & The Shakes - Emergence (The Process Of Becoming) (Ropeadope, 2019)
- Bria Skonberg - Nothing Never Happens (Self released, 2019)
- Circuit Kisser - Faking The Moon Landing (Soundsabound Records, 2020)
- Joshua Crumbly - Rise (Open Book Records, 2020)
- Le'Asha - The Universe Project (Demon Dap Records, 2021)
- Bryan Carter - I Believe (LA Reserve/Bandstand Presents, 2022)
- Ruben Fox - Introducing... Ruben Fox (Rufio Records, 2022)
- John Minnock - Simplicity (Dot Records, 2022)
- Alex Claffy - Music From Big Orange Sheep (Cella Live, 2022)
- Russell Hall - Black Caesar (Self produced, 2022)
- Anthony Hervey - Soul-Food (Outside In Records, 2023)
- Benny Benack III - This Is The Life (Bandstand Presents, 2025)
- Cyrille Aimee - 4.24 (Live) (Self produced, 2025)

== Awards and nominations ==
- Montreux Jazz Piano Competition “Special Prize” (2006)
- Montreux Jazz Piano Competition Second Prize (2014)
- YoungArts Honorable Mention in Jazz (2014)
- ASCAP Next Generation Of Songwriters Recipient (2021)
