= 2K20 =

2K20 may refer to:

- the year 2020
- "Beach 2k20", 2019 song by Robyn
- NBA 2K20, 2019 video game
- WWE 2K20, 2019 video game
