= Between the Lines (Robyn song) =

- Louie Vega remix

Single by Robyn

from the album Honey
- B-side: "Beach 2k20"
- Released: 3 April 2019
- Genre: House; tropical house; minimal techno
- Length: 4:07
- Label: Konichiwa
- Songwriters: Robyn; Klas Åhlund
- Producer: Klas Åhlund

Robyn singles chronology
"Honey" (2018)	"Between the Lines" (2019)	"Ever Again" (2019)

Music video
- "Between the Lines" on YouTube

"Between the Lines" is a song by Swedish singer-songwriter Robyn, recorded for her eighth studio album Honey. It was released as the third single from the album on 3 April 2019 alongside a music video by Ssion. Remixes by Louie Vega, The Black Madonna and Preditah followed on April 12, 19 and 26 respectively.

== Music video ==
The Ssion-directed video, filmed with a camcorder, depicts the singer partying in Ibiza, performing at a festival, and singing in a makeshift ball pit. Inspired by Wham!'s "Club Tropicana" video, Ssion attempted to capture "the aggressive tackiness of tourist culture slapped up against the serene beach vibes" with the "DIY" aesthetic of the video.

== Composition ==
The song features "Latin flair, trappy electro-synth and burly AutoTune".

== Live performance ==
Robyn performed the song in a medley with "Love Is Free" on The Tonight Show with Jimmy Fallon on 18 July 2019 and during the Honey Tour throughout 2019. During the show in Montreal on March 13, she struggled to remember some of the lyrics and sang "I don't know my lines" towards the end.

== Release ==
On 20 June 2020, Robyn released "Between the Lines" on a limited edition 12" vinyl featuring remixes of the song along with "Beach 2k20". It was released as part of a Honey Remix vinyl series, alongside "Honey", "Baby Forgive Me" and "Ever Again", for the Love Record Stores Day 2020 event. Only 500 of each were manufactured.

== Track listing ==
Louie Vega Remix
No.	Title	Length
1.	"Between the Lines" (Louie Vega Remix)	8:43

The Black Madonna Remix
No.	Title	Length
1.	"Between the Lines" (The Black Madonna Remix / Edit)	3:52
2.	"Between the Lines" (The Black Madonna Remix)	5:06

Preditah Remix
No.	Title	Length
1.	"Between the Lines" (Preditah Vocal Mix)	4:17
2.	"Between the Lines" (Preditah Main Mix)	5:48

Limited Edition 12" Vinyl
No.	Title	Length
1.	"Between the Lines" (Louie Vega Remix)	8:43
2.	"Beach 2k20" (Yaeji Remix)	4:55
3.	"Between the Lines" (The Black Madonna)	5:06
4.	"Beach 2k20" (Louie Vega Remix)	6:34
Total length:		25:18

== Personnel ==
Credits adapted from the liner notes of Honey.

- Robyn – vocals, vocal arranging, songwriting, co-production, vocal recording
- Klas Åhlund - songwriting, production, programming, vocal recording
- NealHPogue – mixing
- Mike Bozzi – mastering

== Charts ==
Chart (2018)	Peak position
Sweden (Sverigetopplistan)	95
