= Russell Hall =

Russell Hall may refer to:

- Russell Hall (Georgia)
- Russ Hall (1871–1937), American MLB player
- Russell Hall (Lock Haven)

== See also ==
- Russell Town Hall
- Walter Russell Hall (1831–1911), Australian businessman and philanthropist
- Russells Hall
