= Strathclyde Telegraph =

Student newspaper of the University of Strathclyde

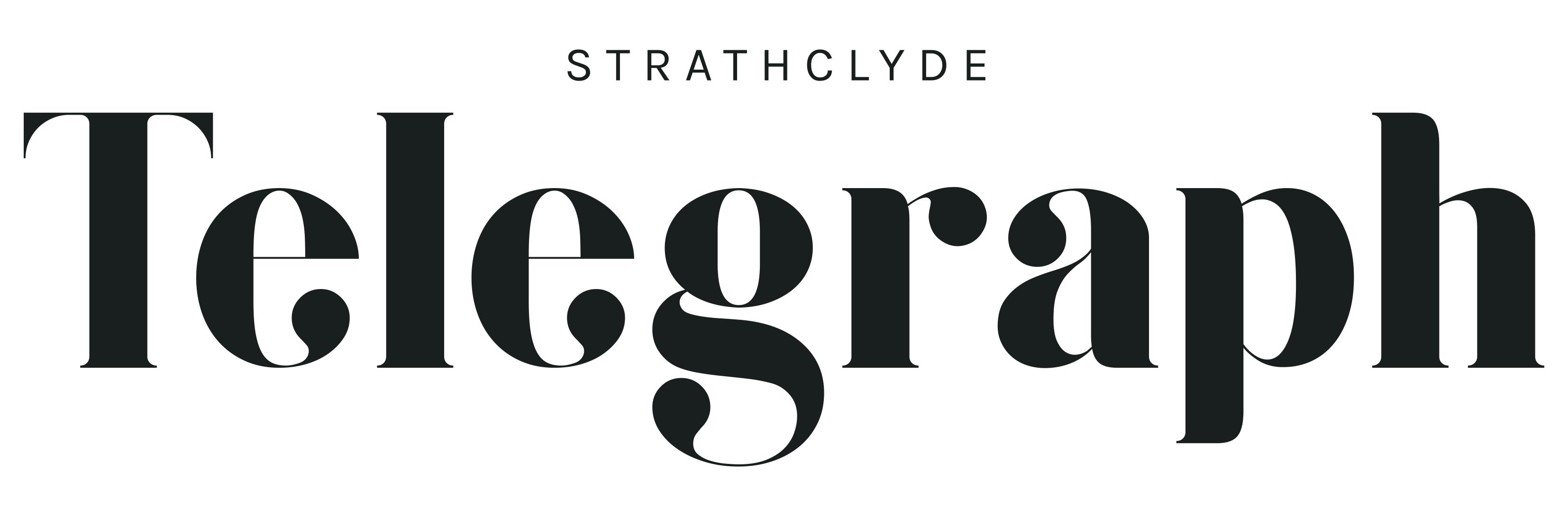
- Type: Student newspaper
- Format: Berliner
- School: University of Strathclyde
- Owner: University of Strathclyde Students' Association
- Editor-in-chief: Julia Braun Raven
- Founded: 1960
- Language: English
- Headquarters: Strath Union; 51 Richmond Street, G1 1XU; Glasgow, Scotland
- Price: Free
- Website: strathclydetelegraph.com

The Strathclyde Telegraph is a student newspaper which was founded in 1960 and is edited, written and produced by students at the University of Strathclyde. It is the University of Strathclyde’s only printed student newspaper and is produced on campus.

The newspaper aims to provide students with experience in their areas of interest and act as a platform for members to gain valuable experience in submitting and editing for print and online. It also strives to serve the Strathclyde community as an outlet to inform students, and to cover cultural events of significance in the university, the city of Glasgow, and beyond.

The newspaper publishes three print editions per year: The Freshers Print, released during Freshers Week; The Winter Print, printed in late November or early December; and the Spring Print, published in early May. The website is updated regularly, and is the main outlet used by the publication.

== Support and resources ==
The Strathclyde Telegraph is provided financial support by the University of Strathclyde's Alumni Fund and the University of Strathclyde Students' Association. Money is also generated through advertising revenue.

== Volunteering opportunities ==
The Strathclyde Telegraph is written, edited, produced and distributed by a team of student volunteers. Volunteers can contribute as a writer and may become a member of the editorial team. They may also attend section meetings, assist in corresponding with editors, and help distribute the paper to stands on campus.

The editorial team consists of the Editor-in-Chief, Deputy Editor-in-Chief, Multimedia Executive, Social Media Executive, News Editor, Politics Editor, Features Editor, Culture Editor, Music Editor, Lifestyle Editor, Creative Editor, and Sport Editor.

Any University of Strathclyde student may volunteer to join as a writer or editor regardless experience and area of study. The newspaper also functions as a university society.

== Distribution ==
Students are able to obtain a copy of the newspaper at the following locations across campus:

• Strath Union – front entrance, ground floor
• Library – entrance
• James Weir Building – next to lifts on the ground floor
• McCance – at the stairs on the ground floor and the cafe on the top floor
• Livingston Tower – cafe and lifts on the ground floor
• Java Cafe
• Biomedical Science building – ground floor study area

== Awards and recognition ==
In 2011 at the Scottish Student Press Awards run by The Herald newspaper. Former writer for the Strathclyde Telegraph, Alan Robertson, was named as both News Writer of the Year and Student Journalist of the Year. This was the 15th year of the awards, with Herald deputy editor, Magnus Llewellin the chair of the judging panel. Winners of seven of the nine categories were entitled to a one-week internship with The Herald; with the winner of the Student Journalist of the Year category entitled to a four-week internship. The newspaper itself came top of the Best Newspaper category where it was competing alongside other student publications The Saint (University of St Andrews) and The Student (University of Edinburgh).

At the 2019 Scottish Student Journalism Awards, the newspaper's website was awarded Website of the Year, while editor Steven Mair was commended for the Gender Equal Media Scotland Award.

In 2025, at The Herald Student Journalism Awards, Kulsum Shabbir was named Best Features Writer. At the Scottish Student Journalism Awards, Matthew Borrie was awarded Best Journalist, and Rhiannon McGoivern received the Biggest Commitment award.
