= Beach 2k20 =

- Yaeji Remix

Single by Robyn

from the album Honey
- A-side: "Between the Lines"
- Released: 4 September 2019
- Genre: House; electro-samba; tropical house; minimal techno
- Length: 5:29
- Label: Konichiwa
- Songwriters: Robyn; Rudolf Nordström; Joseph Mount; Klas Åhlund
- Producer: Mr. Tophat

Robyn singles chronology
"Ever Again" (2019)	"Beach 2k20" (2019)	"Baby Forgive Me" (2019)

"Beach 2k20" is a song by Swedish singer-songwriter Robyn, recorded for her eighth studio album Honey. It was released as the fifth single from the album on 4 September 2019 with a remix by Yaeji. A remix by Louie Vega followed on 17 July 2020.

== Composition ==
Described as a "deadpan house banger" and "one of the most lyrically inane songs of Robyn's career", the song "attempt[s] to capture the exact feelings of just chilling somewhere tropical and quietly enjoying yourself". It features a sample of Timmy Thomas's "Why Can't We Live Together", as well as a musical reference to Robyn's debut "Show Me Love". "Beach 2k20" features "jazzy samba beats" and "the occasional 'Schwoop!' sound you might recognize from a departing iMessage"

== Release ==
On 20 June 2020, Robyn released "Beach 2k20" on a limited edition 12" vinyl featuring remixes of the song along with "Between the Lines". It was released as part of a Honey Remix vinyl series, alongside "Honey", "Baby Forgive Me" and "Ever Again", for the Love Record Stores Day 2020 event. Only 500 of each were manufactured.

== Track listing ==
Yaeji Remix
No.	Title	Length
1.	"Beach 2k20" (Yaeji Remix)	4:55

Louie Vega Remix
No.	Title	Length
1.	"Beach 2k20" (Louie Vega Remix)	6:36

Limited edition 12" vinyl
No.	Title	Length
1.	"Between the Lines" (Louie Vega Remix)	8:43
2.	"Beach 2k20" (Yaeji Remix)	4:55
3.	"Between the Lines" (The Black Madonna Remix)	5:06
4.	"Beach 2k20" (Louie Vega Remix)	6:34
Total length:		25:18

== Personnel ==
Credits adapted from the liner notes of Honey.

- Robyn – vocals, vocal arranging, songwriting, vocal recording
- Joseph Mount – bass guitar, additional synthesizer programming, vocal arranging songwriting, vocal recording
- Klas Åhlund - songwriting
- Mr. Tophat (Rudolf Nordström) - vocal arranging, songwriting, production, vocal recording
- Ludvig Larsson - studio assistance
- NealHPogue – mixing
- Mike Bozzi – mastering

== Charts ==
Chart (2018)	Peak position
Swedish Heatseeker Songs chart	2
