= Du gör mig hel igen =

Single by Cajsalisa Ejemyr
- A-side: "Du gör mig hel igen" (Radio Version)
- B-side: "Du gör mig hel igen" (Festival Version)
- Released: 1997
- Genre: Schlager
- Label: Warner
- Songwriter(s): Robyn; Ulf Lindström; Johan Ekhe

"Du gör mig hel igen" (Swedish: "you make me whole again") was an entry in Melodifestivalen 1997, which was sung by Cajsalisa Ejemyr. Songwriter and part producer of the song was popstar Robin Carlsson (Robyn). The song placed fourth in the contest and later entered the Swedish charts.

== Charts ==
Chart (1997)	Peak position
Sweden	58
