= The Sexistential Tour =

2026 concert tour by Robyn

- Tour by Robyn
- Associated album: Sexistential
- Start date: June 24, 2026
- End date: November 24, 2026
- No. of shows: 24

Robyn concert chronology
- Honey Tour (2019); The Sexistential Tour (2026)

The Sexistential Tour is the ongoing third concert tour by Swedish singer-songwriter Robyn, launched in support of her ninth studio album, Sexistential (2026).

Presented by Live Nation, the tour was officially announced on 6 February 2026 via Robyn's Instagram account, accompanied by teaser visuals and a short album trailer. The tour began on 24 June 2026 at the 3Arena in Dublin and is scheduled to conclude on 24 November 2026 at Rod Laver Arena in Melbourne, comprising 25 shows across Europe, North America, and Oceania.

On 18 February 2026, Robyn announced four additional North American dates due to demand.

== Background ==
Following anticipation surrounding the announcement of Sexistential, Robyn officially revealed The Sexistential Tour on 6 February 2026, accompanied by dates across Europe, North America, and Oceania. The initial announcement generated significant attention among fans and music media, particularly due to the artist's limited live appearances in recent years and the expectation that the new album would introduce a new visual and conceptual era.

The tour's title references the album's themes, which were described in promotional materials as exploring identity, independence, modern relationships, emotional contradictions, and self-expression through Robyn's characteristic blend of electronic pop and dance production.

Demand during early ticket sales proved stronger than expected in several markets. On 18 February 2026, Robyn announced four additional North American performances after multiple dates experienced rapid sell-through. The added shows consisted primarily of second nights in major cities and expanded venue scheduling to accommodate audience demand.

One of the most discussed developments surrounding the tour involved Robyn's planned Stockholm performances. Originally, she had scheduled three consecutive nights at Avicii Arena on 16, 17, and 18 July 2026. However, those concerts were later canceled and replaced with a single hometown performance on 17 October 2026 at 3Arena.

Robyn addressed the decision through Instagram, explaining that consolidating the Stockholm dates into one event would allow for production adjustments and a revised structure for the European leg. The change generated criticism among portions of the fan community, particularly from ticket holders who had arranged travel and accommodations for the original dates. Discussion online focused on concerns regarding accessibility and reduced ticket availability for Swedish audiences. Robyn later acknowledged the disappointment expressed by fans and stated that the revised arrangement was intended to create what she described as a more complete hometown performance experience.

== Tour dates ==
List of 2026 concerts
Date (2026)	City	Country	Venue	Supporting acts	Attendance	Revenue
June 24	Dublin	Ireland	3Arena	Erika de Casier	—	—
June 26	Glasgow	Scotland	OVO Hydro	Smerz	—	—
June 27	Manchester	England	Co-op Live	808 State	—	—
June 30	Brussels	Belgium	ING Arena	Smerz	—	—
July 1	Paris	France	Adidas Arena	Erika de Casier	—	—
July 3	London	England	The O_{2} Arena	Saya Gray	—	—
July 8	Berlin	Germany	Uber Arena	Mechatok	—	—
July 11	Bærum (Note: Labeled as Oslo in promotional material)	Norway	Unity Arena	Romy	—	—
July 14	Copenhagen	Denmark	Royal Arena	Romy	—	—
September 3	Boston	United States	Agganis Arena	Avalon Emerson; The Charms	—	—
September 4	Brooklyn	United States	Barclays Center	Yaeji	—	—
September 8	Washington D.C.	United States	The Anthem	Nourished by Time	—	—
September 9	Washington D.C.	United States	The Anthem	Nourished by Time	—	—
September 10	Brooklyn	United States	Barclays Center	Romy	—	—
September 12	Chicago	United States	United Center	Peaches	—	—
September 15	Toronto	Canada	Scotiabank Arena	Grace Ives	—	—
September 19	Mexico City	Mexico	Palacio de los Deportes	Lykke Li	—	—
September 23	Inglewood (Note: Labeled as Los Angeles in promotional material)	United States	Kia Forum	HorsegiirL	—	—
September 24	Inglewood	United States	Kia Forum	Zhala; Romy Madley Croft	—	—
September 26 (Note: Part of the Portola Music Festival)	San Francisco	United States	Pier 80	—N/a	—N/a	—N/a
October 17	Stockholm	Sweden	3Arena	The Birds; Smerz	—	—
October 30 (Note: Part of the C2C Festival)	Turin	Italy	Lingotto Fiere	—N/a	—N/a	—N/a
November 21	Sydney	Australia	Afterpay Arena	—N/a	—	—
November 24	Melbourne	Australia	Rod Laver Arena	—N/a	—	—

=== Cancelled shows ===
List of cancelled concerts, showing date, city, country, venue and reason for cancellation
Date	City	Country	Venue	Reason
July 16	Stockholm	Sweden	Avicii Arena	Due to upgrade venue
July 17	Stockholm	Sweden	Avicii Arena	Due to upgrade venue
July 18	Stockholm	Sweden	Avicii Arena	Due to upgrade venue
