= Cajsalisa Ejemyr =

Swedish singer and actress

- Born: 7 November 1978 (age 47); Stockholm, Sweden
- Occupations: singer, actress

Cajsalisa Ejemyr (born 7 November 1978 in Stockholm, Sweden) is a Swedish singer and actress.

Cajsalisa performed the song "Du gör mig hel igen" by Robyn in Sweden's preselection for Eurovision Song Contest 1997, Melodifestivalen 1997. The song ended up in 4th place.

== Filmography ==
- Jungfruresan (1988)
- Bert: The Last Virgin (1995) as Victoria
- Skilda världar (1996) (TV-series)
- Svenska hjältar (1997)
- Vita lögner (1997) (TV-series)
- Nya tider (1999) (TV-series)

== Discography ==
=== Albums ===
- Först nu (1997)
- Vad jag vill och lite till (1999)
- Either Way (2003)

=== Singles ===
Title	Year	Peak chart positions	Album
Title	Year	SWE	Album
"Det måste va en dröm"	1997	39	Non-album singles
