= Honey (Robyn album) =

Studio album by Robyn
- Released: 26 October 2018
- Studios: Apmamman, Stockholm; Shelter, Paris; Pigalle, Paris; Strongrooms, London; Futur De l'Audiovisuel, Paris; Konichiwa, Stockholm; 123, Peckham; Tophat, Stockholm; Houses in Los Angeles and Ibiza
- Genres: Electropop; post-disco; dance-pop
- Length: 40:23
- Labels: Konichiwa; Island; Interscope
- Producers: Joseph Mount; Klas Åhlund; Mr. Tophat; Adam Bainbridge; Robyn

Robyn chronology
Love Is Free (2015)	Honey (2018)	Sexistential (2026)

Singles from Honey
- 1. "Missing U" Released: 1 August 2018; 2. "Honey" Released: 26 September 2018; 3. "Between the Lines" Released: 12 April 2019; 4. "Ever Again" Released: 17 June 2019; 5. "Beach 2k20" Released: 4 September 2019; 6. "Baby Forgive Me" Released: 6 November 2019

Honey is the eighth studio album by Swedish singer Robyn, and her first since Body Talk (2010). It was released on 26 October 2018 through Konichiwa, Island and Interscope Records. It features the singles "Missing U", "Honey" (a version of which originally featured in the final season of the HBO series Girls in 2017), "Ever Again", "Beach 2k20", and "Baby Forgive Me". The song "Send to Robin Immediately" also served as part of the promotional campaign for the singer's clothing line collaboration with Björn Borg.

The album features collaborations with Joseph Mount of Metronomy, Klas Åhlund, Adam Bainbridge, Mr. Tophat, and Zhala. It has been called a "significant departure from the hooky, sparkling electro-pop" of the Body Talk album series that in contrast, "pushed even deeper into the emotional intensity which has defined her music, with sparser arrangements and an unusually brooding atmosphere".

== Background, writing and recording ==
Reeling from a breakup with longtime collaborator Max Vitali in early 2014, Robyn spiraled into depression that severely deepened upon the death of close friend Christian Falk to pancreatic cancer that summer for which she eventually cancelled her remaining shows with their group La Bagatelle Magique. Continuing an intensive psychoanalysis regimen of three to four meetings per week for six years that also unpacked everything from an abortion at 19, her parents' divorce, lost childhood then exhaustion in the pursuit of pop stardom in a predatory industry and called-off engagement to Olof Inger, Robyn found her spark again musically after hearing DJ Koze's track "XTC" for the first time at a club in Los Angeles, describing it as having "changed [her] life". Seeking further inspiration, she went clubbing globally, drawing many of her ideas in particular during her stay at Pikes Hotel in Ibiza. Robyn reached out first to Joseph Mount of Metronomy with her ideas and they eventually kept collaborating beyond their expected one-off session. Mount said he had to adjust to Robyn's "emotional transparency" while writing, understanding over time that it is "integral to what she does".

Robyn has stated that the album, recorded in part at studios in Stockholm, London, Paris, New York and Ibiza, features "much more production work on my end". She also said the album represents "this sweet place, like a very soft ecstasy. [...] I danced a lot when I was making it. I found a sensuality and a softness that I don't think I was able to use in the same way before. Everything just became softer." Robyn initially began working on the record alone, which she said allowed her to be more sensual. The album was named for its "glowing, transcendent" title track, which The New York Times has called Robyn's "masterpiece". Robyn created the demo for "Missing U" in the summer 2014 on her laptop along with a LinnDrum machine and a software synth. She noted that the lyrics for the song took two years to complete, before finishing them with producers Joseph Mount and Klas Åhlund.

== Music ==
Robyn became more involved in the production of Honey than she had been on her previous albums, including making beats herself. This resulted in sounds including what The New York Times called "outré future pop" on the track "Human Being", "sensual throb" on "Baby Forgive Me" and "playful '90s house" on "Between the Lines". The song "Send to Robin Immediately" samples the 1989 house track "French Kiss" by Lil Louis, which was the idea of English musician Kindness. Pitchfork writer Jason King notes the album is a "breathless, existential post-disco record".

== Promotion ==
Robyn announced she was working on a new album in February 2018 and teased new music throughout the year; she even appeared at one of the regular Robyn-themed dance events hosted at the Brooklyn Bowl, where she played "Honey" in full for the first time. At the Red Bull Music Festival in New York in May 2018, Robyn stated: "With this album I've gone more back into the softer I get, the more it happens, and the more colors and dynamic a song gets. And for me, that meant shutting down for awhile and being sparse with my impressions and sensitive to what I needed."

The album was officially announced by Robyn in a video message posted to her social media accounts in September 2018. She explained, "It's a personal album, and there are so many things that happened throughout making it that it's really hard for me to explain in one go. I think the best way is for you to listen to it." On 24 September, Robyn revealed the track listing. The full version of "Honey" was premiered by Annie Mac on BBC Radio 1 on 26 September, and was made available as a two-track single online the same day along with the album becoming available to pre-order.

On 20 June 2020, Robyn released a four piece limited edition 12" vinyl series, which featured remixes of songs from the album. The four editions included "Honey", "Ever Again", "Baby Forgive Me" and "Between the Lines / Beach2k20". They were issued as part of the Love Record Stores Day 2020 event and 500 copies of each vinyl were manufactured.

== Critical reception ==
Professional ratings
Aggregate scores
Source	Rating
AnyDecentMusic?	8.3/10
Metacritic	89/100
Review scores
Source	Rating
AllMusic	5/5 stars
The Daily Telegraph	5/5 stars
The Guardian	5/5 stars
The Independent	4/5 stars
The Irish Times	4/5 stars
NME	4/5 stars
Pitchfork	8.5/10
Q	4/5 stars
Rolling Stone	4.5/5 stars
The Times	4/5 stars

Honey received widespread acclaim from music critics. On review aggregator Metacritic, Honey has received a score of 89 out of 100 based on 22 reviews from critics, indicating "universal acclaim". Stacey Anderson of Pitchfork rated the album 8.5 out of 10, giving it the distinction of "Best New Music", and called it an "enthralling record" that "carries the sheen of being created on purely individual terms, on a singular timeline". Anderson said that Honey "builds a bridge from its predecessor, the bionic Body Talk, into a place of new conviction and warmth", with Robyn presenting musical ideas "in a way that makes her resolutions feel both instinctive and deeply traveled; melodies and emotions resolve simultaneously, slowly, and imperfectly, without editorialized conclusions". In her review for AllMusic, Heather Phares gave the album 5 stars out of 5, claiming "Robyn continues to make the trends instead of following them, and with Honey, she enters her forties with some of her most emotionally satisfying and musically innovative music."

In a capsule review for Vice, Robert Christgau gave the album a three-star honourable mention and lamented "how I wish she was the pop sparkplug, club buddy, big sister, and strong lover of the glorious old Body Talk trilogy, but either she doesn't have the hooks anymore or she thinks she's beyond them"; "Missing U" and "Between the Lines" were cited as highlights.

=== Accolades ===
Publication	Accolade	Rank	Ref.
BrooklynVegan	50 Best Albums of 2018	9	
Clash	Clash Albums of the Year 2018	5	
Consequence of Sound	Top 50 Albums of 2018	12	
Dazed	The 20 Best Albums of 2018	2	
Exclaim!	The Top 20 Pop & Rock Albums of 2018	2	
musicOMH	musicOMH's Top 50 Albums of 2018	2	
NME	Best Albums of the Year 2018	11	
Noisey	The 100 Best Albums of 2018	6	
Paste	The 30 Best Pop Albums of the 2010s	15	
Pitchfork	The 50 Best Albums of 2018	4	
Pitchfork	The 200 Best Albums of the 2010s	71	
Pretty Much Amazing	Albums of the Year	2	
Rolling Stone	50 Best Albums of 2018	45	
Slant	The 25 Best Albums of 2018	1	
Time	The 10 Best Albums of 2018	6	
The Guardian	The 50 Best Albums of 2018	2	
The Line of Best Fit	The Best Albums of 2018	17	

== Commercial performance ==
Honey debuted at number one on the Swedish Albums Chart, becoming Robyn's fourth album to reach the top spot. In the United States, the album debuted at number 40 on the Billboard 200 chart and number 1 on the Top Dance/Electronic Albums chart, earning 15,000 equivalent album units, according to Nielsen Music, with 11,000 from traditional album sales.

== Track listing ==
Honey track listing
No.	Title	Writer(s)	Producer(s)	Length
1.	"Missing U"	Robyn; Joseph Mount; Klas Åhlund	Mount; Åhlund; Robyn^{[a]}	4:57
2.	"Human Being" (featuring Zhala)	Robyn; Mount	Mount	3:46
3.	"Because It's in the Music"	Robyn; Mount; Åhlund	Mount; Åhlund	4:34
4.	"Baby Forgive Me"	Robyn; Rudolf Nordström	Mount; Mr. Tophat	4:16
5.	"Send to Robin Immediately"	Robyn; Adam Bainbridge; Marvin Burns	Bainbridge	3:59
6.	"Honey"	Robyn; Åhlund; Markus Jägerstedt	Mount; Åhlund; Robyn^{[a]}	4:53
7.	"Between the Lines"	Robyn; Åhlund	Åhlund; Robyn^{[a]}	4:05
8.	"Beach 2k20"	Robyn; Nordström; Mount; Åhlund	Mr. Tophat	5:29
9.	"Ever Again"	Robyn; Mount	Mount	4:24
Total length:				40:23

Notes

- ^{^[a]} signifies a co-producer.
- Lyrics of "Missing U" partly inspired by "Arvet" by Bruno K Öijer.
- "Send to Robin Immediately" contains a sample of "French Kiss" by Lil Louis.

== Personnel ==
Credits adapted from the liner notes of Honey.

Musicians

- Robyn – vocals (all tracks); Sawer synthesiser programming (track 1); additional arranging (track 4); vocal arranging (all tracks)
- Joseph Mount – synthesiser programming (track 1); bass guitar (tracks 1, 3, 8); additional vocals (track 3); additional synthesiser programming (track 8); electric guitar (track 9); vocal arranging (tracks 1–4, 6, 8, 9)
- Klas Åhlund – additional programming (track 1); deleted flamenco solo (track 3); programming (track 7)
- Zhala – additional vocals (track 2)
- Mr. Tophat – drum programming, sad robot voice, additional arranging (track 4); vocal arranging (tracks 4, 8)
- Adam Bainbridge – additional vocals (track 5)
- Mathis Picard – keyboard (track 5)
- Sampha Sisay – bass synthesiser (track 5)
- Ulf Engström – bass guitar (track 9)

Artwork

- David Lane – creative direction
- Heji Shin – photography
- Sophie Durham – set design
- Laura Jouan – type design
- David Jenewein – photo assistance
- Andreas Klassen – photo assistance
- Joshua Yates – set design assistance
- Molly Owen – set design assistance

Technical

- Joseph Mount – production (tracks 1–4, 6, 9); vocal recording (tracks 1–4, 6, 8, 9)
- Klas Åhlund – production (tracks 1, 3, 6, 7); vocal recording (tracks 1, 3, 4, 6, 7)
- Robyn – co-production (tracks 1, 6, 7); vocal recording (all tracks)
- Zhala – additional vocals recording (track 2)
- Mr. Tophat – production, vocal recording (tracks 4, 8)
- Adam Bainbridge – production (track 5)
- David Jones – studio assistance (tracks 2, 4, 9)
- Ludvig Larsson – studio assistance (tracks 5, 8)
- NealHPogue – mixing (tracks 2–5, 7–9)
- Serban Ghenea – mixing (track 1)
- John Hanes – engineering for mix (track 1)
- Zdar – mixing (track 6)
- Antoine Poyeton – studio assistance (track 6)
- Louis Gallet – studio assistance (track 6)
- Mike Bozzi – mastering (tracks 2–5, 7–9)
- Randy Merrill – mastering (track 1)
- Mike Marsh – mastering (track 6)

== Charts ==
=== Weekly charts ===
Weekly chart performance for Honey
Chart (2018)	Peak position
Australian Albums (ARIA)	20
Austrian Albums (Ö3 Austria)	49
Belgian Albums (Ultratop Flanders)	10
Belgian Albums (Ultratop Wallonia)	98
Canadian Albums (Billboard)	33
Danish Albums (Hitlisten)	20
Dutch Albums (Album Top 100)	55
Estonian Albums (IFPI)	26
French Download Albums (SNEP)	19
German Albums (Offizielle Top 100)	65
Irish Albums (IRMA)	38
Norwegian Albums (VG-lista)	2
Scottish Albums (Official Charts)	16
Spanish Albums (Promusicae)	48
Swedish Albums (Sverigetopplistan)	1
Swiss Albums (Schweizer Hitparade)	46
UK Albums (Official Charts)	21
US Billboard 200	40
US Top Dance Albums (Billboard)	1

=== Year-end charts ===
Year-end chart performance for Honey
Chart (2018)	Position
Swedish Albums (Sverigetopplistan)	85

== See also ==
- List of Billboard number-one electronic albums of 2018
- List of number-one singles and albums in Sweden
