= Maluca Mala =

American singer-songwriter

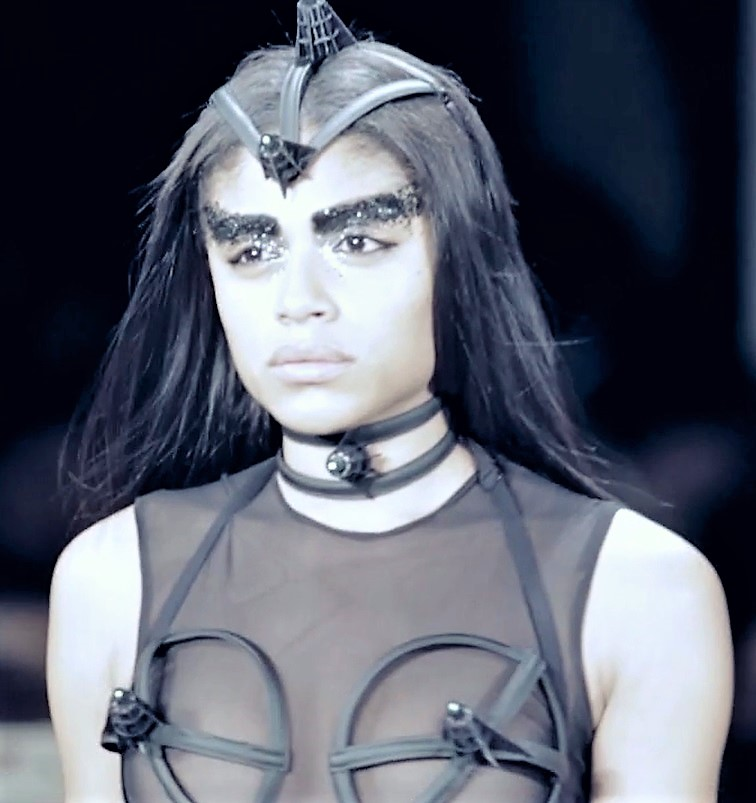
- Mala at the Chromat Autumn-Winter 2015 runway show

Background information
- Born: Natalie Ann Yepez
- Origin: Washington Heights, Manhattan
- Genres: Electro, experimental tropical punk, ghettotech, hip house
- Labels: RPM MSC, Mad Decent

Natalie Ann Yepez, better known by her stage name Maluca, is an American singer who grew up in Washington Heights, Manhattan. Raised on a steady diet of bachata, cumbia, merengue, and mambo, as well as hip-hop and other club music, Maluca's music has been described as "experimental tropical punk, ghettotech, and hip-house". Although a bad case of stage fright kept her out of the spotlight for much of her life, a chance meeting with Diplo while performing karaoke eventually led to "El Tigeraso", Maluca's first single.

The years 2009 and 2010 saw her touring, performing, and releasing what she calls "tropical punk" tracks. Since the release of her single in 2009, Maluca has recorded tracks that range from merengue mashups to kuduro to old-school deep house and focused on her stage show, which includes two dancers named the Cookies. China Food is her latest release as she prepares for a second visit to South by South West.

The name Maluca in Spanish is a derivative of Mala which means bad or mean girl. In Portuguese Maluca means a crazy or mischievous girl.

== Discography ==
=== EPs ===
Title	Year	Peak position
El Tigeraso	2009	11

=== Singles ===
==== As lead artist ====
Title	Year	Peak positions	Album
Title	Year	US Latin Rhythm	Album
"El Tigeraso" (feat. Diplo)	2009	11	FIFA 11 & Tuenti Movil Advert (soundtrack)
"Hector"	2010	-	China Food mixtape
"Trigger"	2014	-	-
"Mala"	2016	-	-

==== As featured artist ====
Title	Year	Peak positions	Album
Title	Year	US Latin Rhythm	Album
"La Campana" (Tittsworth and Alvin Risk featuring Maluca)	2011	-	FIFA 12 (soundtrack); Two Strokes Raw
"Que Que" (Dillon Francis and Diplo featuring Maluca)	2011	-	Que Que Remixes
"My Window" (Don Diablo featuring Maluca)	2015	-	-
"Love Is Free" (Robyn & La Bagatelle Magique featuring Maluca)	2015	-	-
"Bury Me" (Brodinski feat. Maluca & Bricc Baby Shitro)	2015	-	Brava
