= Missing U (song) =

Single by Robyn

from the album Honey
- Released: 1 August 2018
- Genre: Synth-pop; disco; dance
- Length: 4:57
- Label: Konichiwa
- Songwriters: Robyn; Klas Åhlund; Joseph Mount
- Producers: Robyn; Klas Åhlund; Joseph Mount

Robyn singles chronology
"Hang Me Out to Dry" (2016)	"Missing U" (2018)	"Honey" (2018)

Lyric video
- "Missing U" on YouTube

"Missing U" is a song by Swedish singer-songwriter Robyn, released on 1 August 2018 as the lead single from her eighth studio album, Honey (2018). It serves as her first solo single in eight years. The song premiered on Annie Mac's show on BBC Radio 1. The single was preceded by a seven-minute short video used to promote the single.

== Background ==
"Missing U" is Robyn's first solo release since her triple album Body Talk (2010). Robyn released several collaborative EPs including Do It Again (2014) and Love Is Free (2015). Robyn also had an appearance on the HBO series Girls soundtrack with the song "Honey" before work on her eighth studio album began.

The demo for the song was created by Robyn in mid-2014 on her laptop along with a LinnDrum machine and a software synth. She noted that the lyrics for the song took two years to complete before finishing them with producers Joseph Mount and Klas Åhlund.

== Composition ==
"Missing U" is a synth-pop and disco song about when people disappear as well as the singer's relationship with her fans. The chorus is backed by bubbling synths, while the rest of the song contains a minimal drum beat and grandiose synth loops. The song is considered a departure from Robyn's previous work, lacking the climax that her previous songs had, instead taking on a more demo-like quality. The song was written and produced by Robyn, Klas Åhlund, and Joseph Mount.

== Critical reception ==
The song was critically lauded upon release. Amanda Arnold, writing for The Cut, called the song "characteristically dance-y and synth-based and impossible to get out of your head once it's there." She also compared the song favourably to Robyn's previous singles "Dancing on My Own" and "Call Your Girlfriend". Spencer Kornhaber of The Atlantic wrote that "Robyn holds back just enough to describe something too difficult, or too ephemeral, to deal with otherwise."

== Track listings ==
Digital download
No.	Title	Length
1.	"Missing U"	4:51

Digital download
No.	Title	Length
1.	"Missing U" (Weiss Remix Edit)	4:02
2.	"Missing U" (Weiss Remix)	7:13
3.	"Missing U" (Weiss Dub)	5:25

Digital download
No.	Title	Length
1.	"Missing U" (Silk City & Picard Brothers Remix Edit)	3:32
2.	"Missing U" (Silk City & Picard Brothers Remix)	5:27

== Credits and personnel ==
Adapted from Tidal.

- Robin Carlsson – vocals, composition, co-production
- Joseph Mount – composition, production, bass guitar, synthesizer programming
- Klas Åhlund – composition, production, programming
- John Hanes – mix engineering, studio personnel
- Randy Merrill – master engineering, studio personnel
- Serban Ghenea – mixing, studio personnel

== Charts ==
Chart (2018)	Peak position
Australia Digital Tracks (ARIA)	36
Belgium (Ultratip Bubbling Under Flanders)	2
Belgium (Ultratip Bubbling Under Wallonia)	29
Belgium Dance (Ultratop Flanders)	3
Belgium Dance (Ultratop Wallonia)	20
Iceland (RÚV)	4
Ireland (IRMA)	77
New Zealand Hot Singles (RMNZ)	21
Norwegian Digital Songs (Billboard)	6
Scotland Singles (OCC)	35
Sweden (Sverigetopplistan)	13
UK Singles (OCC)	87
UK Dance (OCC)	15
US Hot Dance/Electronic Songs (Billboard)	18
