= Baby Forgive Me =

- Floorplan Remix

Single by Robyn

from the album Honey
- Released: 6 November 2019
- Genre: Deep house
- Length: 4:16
- Label: Konichiwa
- Songwriter(s): Robyn; Rudolf Nordström
- Producer(s): Joseph Mount; Mr. Tophat

Robyn singles chronology
"Beach 2k20" (2019)	"Baby Forgive Me" (2019)	"Impact" (2020)

"Baby Forgive Me" is a song by Swedish singer-songwriter Robyn, recorded for her eighth studio album Honey. It was released as the sixth single from the album on 6 November 2019 with a remix by Young Marco. A remix by Floorplan followed on 3 July 2020.

== Composition ==
The deep house track features vocals "haunted" by "a sinister, off-key electronic shadow", with sounds of audience cheering in the distance. The song fades seamlessly into the album's next track "Send to Robin Immediately".

== Release ==
On 20 June 2020, Robyn released "Baby Forgive Me" on a limited edition 12" vinyl featuring remixes of the song released as part of a Honey Remix vinyl series, alongside vinyls of "Honey", Beach 2k20" "Between the Lines" and "Ever Again", for the Love Record Stores Day 2020 event. Only 500 of each were manufactured.

== Track listing ==
Young Marco Remix
No.	Title	Length
1.	"Baby Forgive Me" (Young Marco Remix)	7:07

Floorplan Remix
No.	Title	Length
1.	"Baby Forgive Me" (Floorplan Remix)	7:24
2.	"Baby Forgive Me" (Floorplan Dub)	6:52

Limited Edition 12" Vinyl
No.	Title	Length
1.	"Baby Forgive Me" (Young Marco Remix)	7:07
2.	"Baby Forgive Me" (Young Marco Dub)	5:21
3.	"Baby Forgive Me" (Floorplan Remix)	7:24
4.	"Baby Forgive Me" (Floorplan Dub)	6:52
Total length:		26:44

== Personnel ==
Credits adapted from the liner notes of Honey.

- Robyn – vocals, vocal arranging, additional arranging, songwriting, vocal recording
- Joseph Mount – production, vocal arranging, vocal recording
- Klas Åhlund - vocal recording
- Mr. Tophat (Rudolf Nordström) - drum programming, sad robot voice, additional arranging, vocal arranging, songwriting, production, vocal recording
- David Jones - studio assistance
- NealHPogue – mixing
- Mike Bozzi – mastering

== Charts ==
Chart (2018)	Peak position
Sweden (Sverigetopplistan)	84
