= Love Is Free (EP) =

2015 EP by Robyn & La Bagatelle Magique

EP (Mini-album) by Robyn & La Bagatelle Magique
- Released: 7 August 2015
- Genre: Dance; electropop; house
- Length: 20:50
- Label: Konichiwa; Cherrytree; Interscope
- Producer: Robyn & La Bagatelle Magique; Klas Åhlund; Carli

Robyn chronology
Do It Again (2014)	Love Is Free (2015)	Honey (2018)

Singles from Robyn
- 1. "Love Is Free" Released: 19 June 2015; 2. "Set Me Free" Released: 24 July 2015

Love Is Free is a "mini-album" by Robyn & La Bagatelle Magique, released on 7 August 2015 by the record labels Konichiwa, Cherrytree, and Interscope.

"Tell You (Today)" was originally released in September 2014 and is a cover of the 1983 disco song "Tell You Today" by Loose Joints, written by that group's founding member Arthur Russell. It originally appeared on the Red Hot tribute album to him, Master Mix: Red Hot + Arthur Russell, in October 2014.

Primarily a dance, electropop, and house record, Love Is Free features influences of disco, Italo disco, and acid house.

== Critical reception ==
Professional ratings
Aggregate scores
Source	Rating
Metacritic	73/100
Review scores
Source	Rating
Consequence of Sound	C+
Entertainment Weekly	B
Exclaim!	8/10
NME	7/10
Now	4/5 stars
The Observer	3/5 stars
Pitchfork	7.2/10
Slant Magazine	3.5/5 stars
Spin	6/10

Love Is Free received generally positive reviews from music critics. At Metacritic, which assigns a normalized rating out of 100 to reviews from mainstream critics, the album received an average score of 73, which indicates "generally favorable reviews", based on 12 reviews.

== Track listing ==
No.	Title	Writer(s)	Producer(s)	Length
1.	"Lose Control"	Robyn; Christian Falk; Markus Jägerstedt	Robyn & La Bagatelle Magique	3:03
2.	"Love Is Free" (featuring Maluca)	Robyn; Falk; Jägerstedt; Natalie Ann Yepez; Charles Farrar	Robyn & La Bagatelle Magique; Klas Åhlund^{[a]}; Carli^{[a]}	5:07
3.	"Got to Work It Out"	Robyn; Falk; Jägerstedt; Herby E. Azor; Toi Crystal Jackson	Robyn & La Bagatelle Magique	4:29
4.	"Set Me Free"	Robyn; Falk; Jägerstedt	Robyn & La Bagatelle Magique	4:23
5.	"Tell You (Today)"	Arthur Russell	Robyn & La Bagatelle Magique	3:46
Total length:				20:50

Notes

- ^{^[a]} signifies an additional producer

== Charts ==
Chart (2015)	Peak position
UK Albums (OCC)	111
US Top Dance Albums (Billboard)	1

== Release history ==
Region	Date	Format	Label	Ref.
Various	7 August 2015	CD; digital download	Konichiwa; Cherrytree; Interscope	
Japan	8 August 2015	Digital download	Konichiwa; Cherrytree; Interscope	
