= Robyn & La Bagatelle Magique =

Swedish pop music group

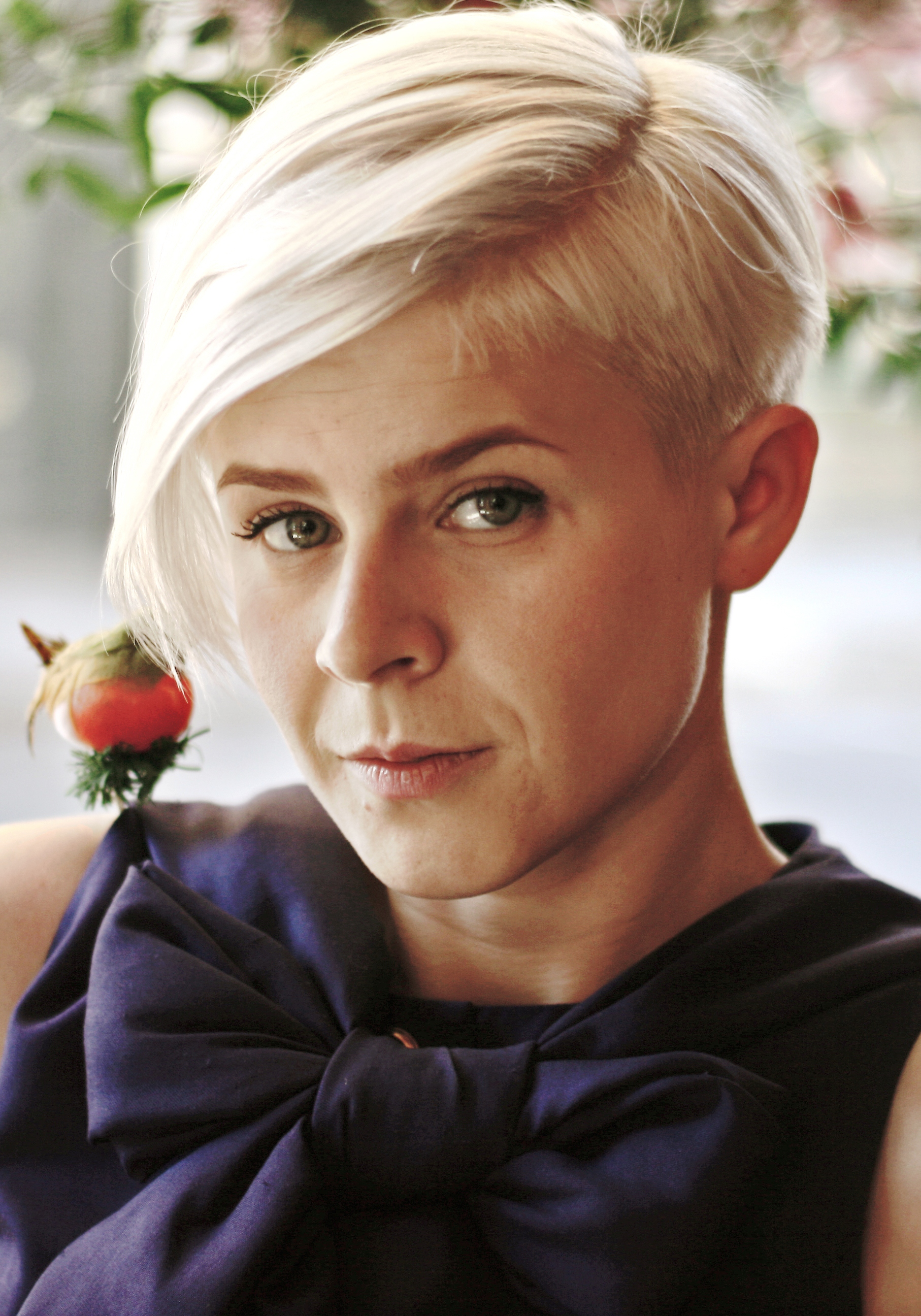
Robyn

Robyn & La Bagatelle Magique, sometimes abridged as La Bagatelle Magique, is a music group featuring Robyn, keyboardist Markus Jägerstedt, and the late producer Christian Falk. Their first song "Love Is Free", which features Maluca, premiered in June 2015. The group released an EP called Love Is Free on August 7, 2015, which includes the tracks "Lose Control", "Set Me Free", and a cover of Arthur Russell's 1983 song "Tell You Today".
