= Honey (Robyn song) =

Single by Robyn

from the album Honey
- Released: 26 September 2018
- Genre: House-pop; alternative pop; techno
- Length: 4:53
- Label: Konichiwa
- Songwriters: Robyn; Klas Åhlund; Markus Jägerstedt
- Producer: Joseph Mount

Robyn singles chronology
"Missing U" (2018)	"Honey" (2018)	"Between the Lines" (2019)

Music video
- "Honey" on YouTube

"Honey" is a song by Swedish singer-songwriter Robyn, released on 26 September 2018 as the second single from her eighth studio album of the same name. Described as a mid-tempo house-pop and alternative-pop song with techno influences, "Honey" is produced by Joseph Mount of Metronomy, co-produced and co-written by Robyn and her frequent collaborators Klas Åhlund and Markus Jägerstedt, and mixed by the late Phillip Zdar of Cassius. The song's premiere on 21 May 2018 during her surprise DJ set at ADVENTURE[s]' Robyn-themed pop-up club series' 'This Party is Killing You' at the Brooklyn Bowl resolved rampant social media speculation surrounding her team's arduous editing of it over a year after an early demo of the song, a drastically divergent version sonically, was partially used on 16 April 2017 on the series finale of HBO comedy-drama Girls (2012–2017) then a recording of that audio was taken off SoundCloud. Robyn's self-described "white whale", the song took over four years in total from its conception to complete, the longest in her career.

"Honey" was made available as a two-track single online the same day as its accompanying album became available to pre-order and its radio premiere on Annie Mac's show on BBC Radio 1 on 26 September 2018. Depicting an abstract description of pleasure, sensuality, and peace of mind, some of its lyrics reference The Rolling Stones' "You Can't Always Get What You Want" (1969), flipping its message of want vs. need to a lover to signify her abandonment of optimism. The song was inspired by Robyn's recovery from past trauma, her favorite "hypnotic" songs and her fascination with 'honey' as a dichotomous concept.

Critical reception was largely laudatory and included The New York Times, who deemed the song Robyn's "masterpiece" and ranked the song as one of the greatest tracks of 2018. An accompanying music video, directed by longtime collaborator Max Vitali, was first released on 5 December 2018, meant to show catharsis through movement that would express one's self and/or their sexual liberation. It shows Robyn dancing in a warehouse amongst other dancers she found through a Twitter casting call emphasizing many body types and ethnic background diversity.

== Background and creation ==
After a year in Stockholm starting in roughly mid-2012, "learning production on a non-profit course that she helped to develop further with her own tech festival Tekla", Robyn was picking up “hypnotic”, "weird" rhythms on some of her music programs and machines. Letting things be “awkward and undefined” in "continuous loops" in a studio by herself "like the trance and rave tunes she heard out in clubs", Robyn was experimenting with her frequent collaborator and touring band member Markus Jägerstedt on a broken Casio synthesizer during a break on one soundcheck in 2013 when she heard the spliced, uneven bassline its glitch created by itself for the first time, become obsessed with it and deciding to record it. Not satisfied with the different techniques Markus tried to layer on it subsequently, she saved it away on her hard drive.

Following a period of personal trauma in 2013 and 2014 including a breakup with Max Vitali and the death of her close friend Christian Falk, Robyn started writing for the album again in 2015 and brought the beat out to layer on again. Feeling rhythmically "claustrophobic" after the Body Talk era and needing to "rewire" her own relationship with rhythm to feel "freer", she spent two months trying rhythms and sounds and freestyling on the beat, inspired by her favorite tracks that required "patience" for a "high", such as George McCrae's "Rock Your Baby" (1974), Donna Summer's "I Feel Love" (1977), Kate Bush's "Running Up That Hill" (1985) and DJ Koze's "XTC" (2015), before finally settling on a melody after working on a chord progression with Marcus that was heading for a feeling of "healing" where she could "calm herself down". Initially uncomfortable with the thought of collaborating again, she finally reached out to Klas Ahlund after several weeks, feeling a "freedom" to describe her ideas in a much more "protected" format given she was presenting a song she had built on her own from the ground-up. Lyrically, Robyn got "stuck" on the word 'honey', becoming obsessed with it and initially not knowing why. Further on, she thought the concept of the word was funny as it was taken to mean "something you'd call your lover" but was also a "weird", "interesting", "somewhat disgusting substance bees make". Klas and Robyn would write the lyrics together, with Robyn explaining to him she wanted them to be an "abstract description of a feeling" and to have the person listening be able to "find their own space where they could associate more freely about pleasure, sensuality, and peace of mind". Finding the writing process "healing", Robyn meant for the song to symbolize finding a sweetness when you dig deep enough into your own past pain, best exemplified by her favorite line, "down in the deep the honey is sweeter".

Having at this point completed a rough demo for the track by early 2017, actress Lena Dunham asked Robyn about music she was currently working on that she could include on her HBO series Girls and of the several demos Robyn sent, Lena picked Honey. Taking this as inspiration to develop the song past its current stage and include it on her album, she kept the melodic and lyrical structure, removing Ahlund's almost in its entirety to substitute her own. Brainstorming for new ideas, she reached out to Joseph Mount of Metronomy, one of her favorite bands, and he signed on, starting out by spending a week "playing around" with "string effects" on the song. Finished with this extremely "sparse" and "minimalist" second demo for weeks, Joseph changed his mind, calling Klas and Robyn both back to the studio to start yet again from scratch, with just Robyn's lyrics and melody and Markus' chord progression and broken Casio bassline. After several days, Mount re-emerged having put the string effect and melody through a "stupid but fun" house filter to follow Robyn's vision of "feeling like you were underwater but then you look down and there’s thousands of meters down to the bottom of the sea, this feeling of something opening underneath". Dubbed what the team called the "sample sauce", Robyn thought it was amazing but still too "undefined". Aiming for slightly more "hints" of an "actual choral structure", and at least a "simple melody" that could still "leave space for a lot up to the imagination", she was inspired by dance music she listened to growing up that didn't have a definitive beginning and end. They eventually added most prominently a "galluping" rhythm together with a kick drum on top of the bassline, and Robyn began experimenting with a relaxed vocal delivery in a different way than she ever had, Klas pushing her to re-record three times and push its "softness" to its aesthetic limit.

Finally completed with the track's 2nd demo and ready for mixing, Robyn had the idea to give it to Phillip Zdar, one half of the band Cassius, because she felt like the song "needed to be mixed" as a "club track", and felt Phillip was best known in the industry for his "tape delay" vocal takes. Having accepted, she received the final product weeks later and was stunned as it was the first time in her career she'd got a mix sent back to her that was up to her standard the "first time she heard it". Robyn's many vocal sessions were done throughout Sweden, Paris, and Los Angeles, but the majority of its production and recording was done at Ahlund's studio in Stockholm and its mixing in Paris at Phillip Zdar's studio. Robyn admitted after its release to Dazed's Anna Cafolla there were upwards of "20 versions" of the track by the end of its mixing process from across the nearly year and a half of its recording, and years later she explained to Song Exploder's Hrishikesh Hirway her "perspective" on its meaning had changed, in similar fashion to her hindsight on "most" of her past tracks, becoming much more emotionally cathartic, especially following the death of Phillip to an accidental fall in Paris. Robyn later explained to Time's Sam Lansky that she “spent more time on" 'Honey' than "on any other piece of music in [her] whole life,” wanting the song to "be more than mood" but a "physical feeling" and "make sure [it] explained" when you "almost" "go through big changes" and "have those experiences that are fundamentally changing, or spiritual" such as a death or "break-up" that "destabilizes you in this intense way”, further revealing the "years she spent feeling lost changed her indelibly" and she wouldn't likely "'be able to go back to feeling the security that [she] felt before'" given her renewed awareness of how "'unstable the world is'" including "'the things we take for granted'”.

== Composition and release ==
"Honey" is a midtempo house-pop and techno song, keeping a tempo of 116 bpm in common time and a key of B minor. The song was compared in mood, production, and tempo to clubs' "sunrise" playlists typically played long after last call in anticipation of closing, becoming softer. Its production most prominently features a "pounding kick drum [...] loud and upfront" that is "side-chained to the pulsating synth", which is designed to make the track sound like it is "breathing", made predominantly with a vintage modelling remake of the rare 1980's Soviet analog Polivoks synthesizer, the Sawer synthesizer. Filling out the rest of the track's production are synths and filters from numerous machines and digital controllers belonging to herself, her co-producers and co-writers including but not limited to DAW and MIDI sequencer Logic Pro, an "old analogue" LinnDrum, and others Robyn said she "collected over the years", specifically from late friend Christian Falk. The "woozy", "languid", "gauzy" and "sensual" production including a "seductive", "aching" hook is meant to "amplify a sense of anticipation", with a "beat that buzzes and rolls somehow synesthetically", and the song was written "rhythm-first", with verses described as being sung "nearly rapped" for their cadence, speed, and relaxed vocal quality, over a "backdrop" that "thumps neatly" and "cooly [sic?]". Rolling Stone described the soundscape and songwriting as "deceptively serene" with a "vortex of beats" amidst a "golden-colored and opaque" "sea" that included "vintage synth stabs recalling the timbral signature of Kate Bush’s “Running Up That Hill”, and "a rippling electronic phrase" following her line "the current is stronger" that "drives that point home", feeling that "It’s hard not to drown in it as she promises: 'No, you’re not going to get what you need/Baby, I have what you want/Come get your honey'" as "It’s an enticing promise but tastes more bitter than sweet, like a siren calling sailors to their death". Stylus' Alfred Soto made comparisons of its "aqueous beat" to "late nineties echos" of Madonna's Ray of Light (1998) and Sasha & Digweed, and the publication's Katharine St. Asaph felt it evoked "most obviously Róisín Murphy", before clarifying that it still sounded "like nothing else in the alt-pop world, which is a goddamn achievement." Time's Sam Lansky found the track "layered and psychedelic, like a Balearic dance party - more tactile than sonic."

The vast array of technology used on the track was due largely to an arduous writing and production process from Robyn's high standards, "perfectionism", and final say with her collaborators, a process that lasted over a year and half with infamously over "20 versions" of the track, "driving Klas and Joseph crazy". While unofficial credit is spread across most of her collaborators for their shared contributions in various measures to many facets of the song, which follows Robyn's well-established preference of creative process, on a granular level, according to a lengthy analysis with Song Exploder's Hrishikesh Hirway, she specified who contributed the most to each. The song's chord progression was thanks largely to Markus Jägerstedt, it is early pop format's "broken Casio" "split bassline" that inspired the final version thanks to Markus and Robyn, its melody, tempo, and chorus came mostly from Robyn, its lyrics and vocal production split between Klas Ahlund and Robyn, its rhythmic effects largely thanks to Klas, its "underwater" house "special sauce" filter and drowning-in-honey revamp including string effects largely thanks to Joseph Mount, and its mixing entirely credited to Phillip Zdar. Robyn clarified to Pilerats' Hayden Davies later on that "neither Joseph or Klas" were "club heads", so she felt like she "had to protect" the "single's rhythm" that she "found herself captivated by" as "Honey transformed time and time again – up to just weeks before release. 'Because I don't know how to produce very well, it just took longer than what I've ever done before. I had a really particular idea, and I wanted it to be what I had heard and experienced.'"

Conceptually, the song balances multiple metaphors, most predominantly making use of the dichotomous concept of honey as an expression to call your lover yet also its property as a "weird" and "viscous" substance. Numerous critics praised the analogy insofar as the love she describes in the song could be "fleeting" like honey that escapes through your fingers, and/or be a substance that "sucks you in" like a hand in its jar or the early stages of a relationship you then realize too late is stuck. The song follows a familiar bittersweet songwriting template for Robyn of upbeat and/or uplifting production with sad lyrics, with its "show-stopping maelstrom of ethereal pulses and kicks" encapsulating Robyn's vision of "the inherent human need for contact, warmth, love and music; battling hard against the rocky shores of heartbreak," resembling honey's property as a "thicker, slower, and subtler version" of the "pop sugar" rush that came much more quickly from the songs in her Body Talk era.

On 20 June 2020, Robyn released "Honey" on limited edition 12" vinyl, which featured remixes of the song. It was released as part of a Honey Remix vinyl series, alongside of "Ever Again", "Baby Forgive Me" and "Between The Lines / Beach2k20", as part of the Love Record Stores Day 2020 event. Only 500 copies of each vinyl were manufactured.

== Critical reception ==
'Honey' received near unanimous praise from music critics globally. The New York Times' Caryn Ganz described it as "glowing" while she and Time's Sam Lansky deemed the song Robyn's "masterpiece". Lansky and MTV's Madelin Roth both called it "transcendent", and Roth further described it as a "sweet slice of pristine pop with vocals that are equal parts blissful, enticing, and aching", feeling it was Robyn "at her most bittersweet — arguably her best zone". The Cut's Jessica Hopper called it "flawless", and Rolling Stone called "Honey" a "languid" "tour-de-force" "that could run for 72 hours straight and never feel entirely unwelcome." Pitchfork named "Honey" the 2nd best song of 2018.

Atwood Magazine's Matthew Tordoff felt 'Honey' marked a "newer, more optimistic shift" in the "tone of Robyn's discography", noting the balance the song struck between its "overtly sexual", "sure, cocky challenge" to its subject and its "innocence", "vulnerab[ility]", and "honest[y]", praising the "deliberate" construction, "airy" vocals and verse "placement", as well as its "previously un-explored themes" and "different sound" which didn't "meander" but didn't "rush along, as you would expect from a stereotypical pop song, either" that had clearly "been in the works for a while". Intrigued its "sensual lyrics" still "examin[ed] how female sexuality has been commercialised", Esquire's Olivia Ovenden called it "one of many tracks" in her career "fixat[ed] with never letting her music stand still long enough to just be one thing". Highsnobiety's Douglas Greenwood called 'Honey' a "remarkable cut of potent, visceral club music" that "recklessly plays with intimacy, taking us to a desolate dance floor with each listen."

== Live performances ==
Robyn performed "Honey" in full for the first time at the Brooklyn Bowl.

== Usage in media ==
A version of "Honey" was originally featured in the final season of the HBO series Girls in 2017. "Honey" was also used in Swedish-Georgian 2019 film And Then We Danced.

== Track listing ==
- Digital download
1. "Honey (Single Edit) – 3:19
2. "Honey" – 4:54
- Digital download (Kim Ann Foxman Remix)
1. "Honey" (Kim Ann Foxman Remix) – 6:14
- Digital download (Joe Goddard Remix)
1. "Honey" (Joe Goddard Remix Edit) – 4:31
2. "Honey" (Joe Goddard Remix) – 8:09
- Digital download (Avalon Emerson's Deep Current Reroll)
1. "Honey" (Avalon Emerson's Deep Current Reroll) – 6:01
- Vinyl (Remixes)
1. "Honey" (Avalon Emerson's Deep Current Reroll) – 6:01
2. "Honey" (Joe Goddard Remix) – 8:09
3. "Honey" (Kim Ann Foxman Remix) – 6:15

== Charts ==
Chart (2018–19)	Peak position
Belgium (Ultratip Bubbling Under Flanders)	8
Belgium (Ultratip Bubbling Under Wallonia)	46
New Zealand Hot Singles (RMNZ)	25
Scottish Singles Sales (Official Charts)	84
Sweden (Sverigetopplistan)	23
US Hot Dance/Electronic Songs (Billboard)	26
