= List of street newspapers =

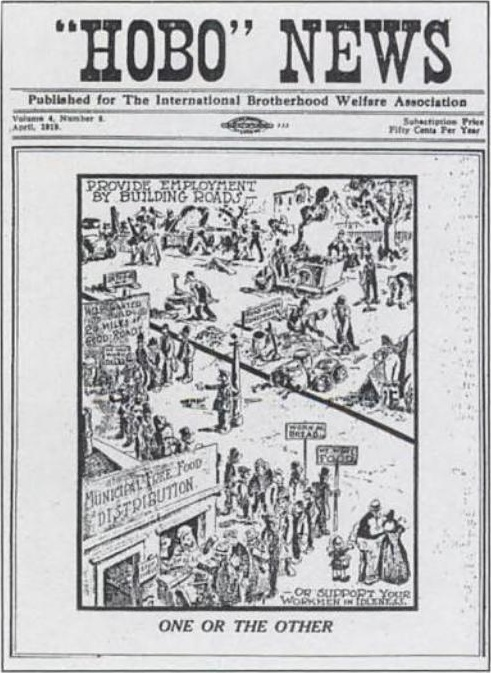
The cover of the Hobo News in the late 1910s, published by the International Brotherhood Welfare Association

This is a list of notable street newspapers. A street newspaper is a newspaper or magazine sold by homeless or poor individuals and produced mainly to support these populations. Most such newspapers primarily provide coverage about homelessness and poverty-related issues, and seek to strengthen social networks within homeless communities. Street papers aim to give these individuals both employment opportunities and a voice in their community. In addition to being sold by homeless individuals, many of these papers are partially produced and written by them.

== Street newspapers ==
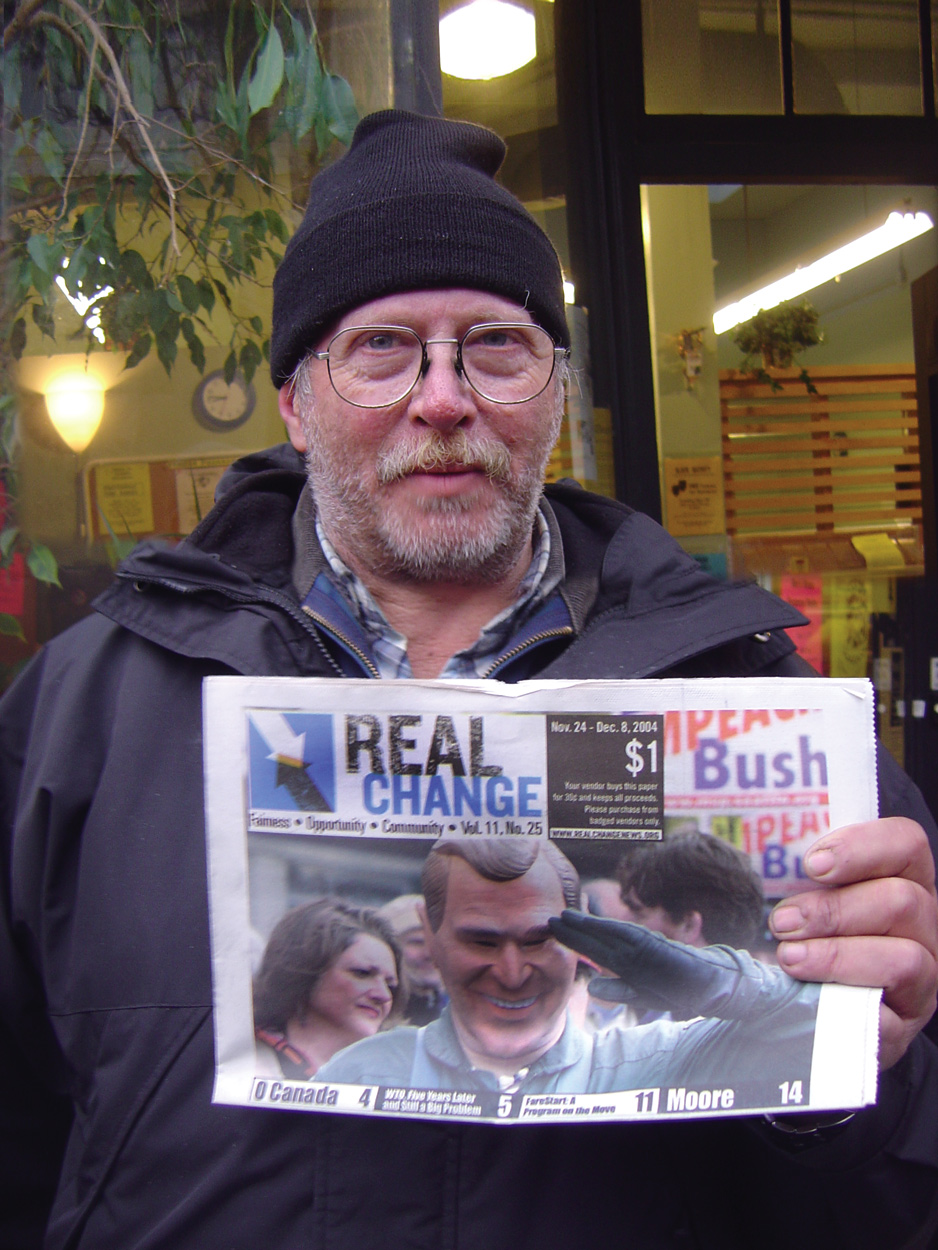
A Real Change vendor in 2008

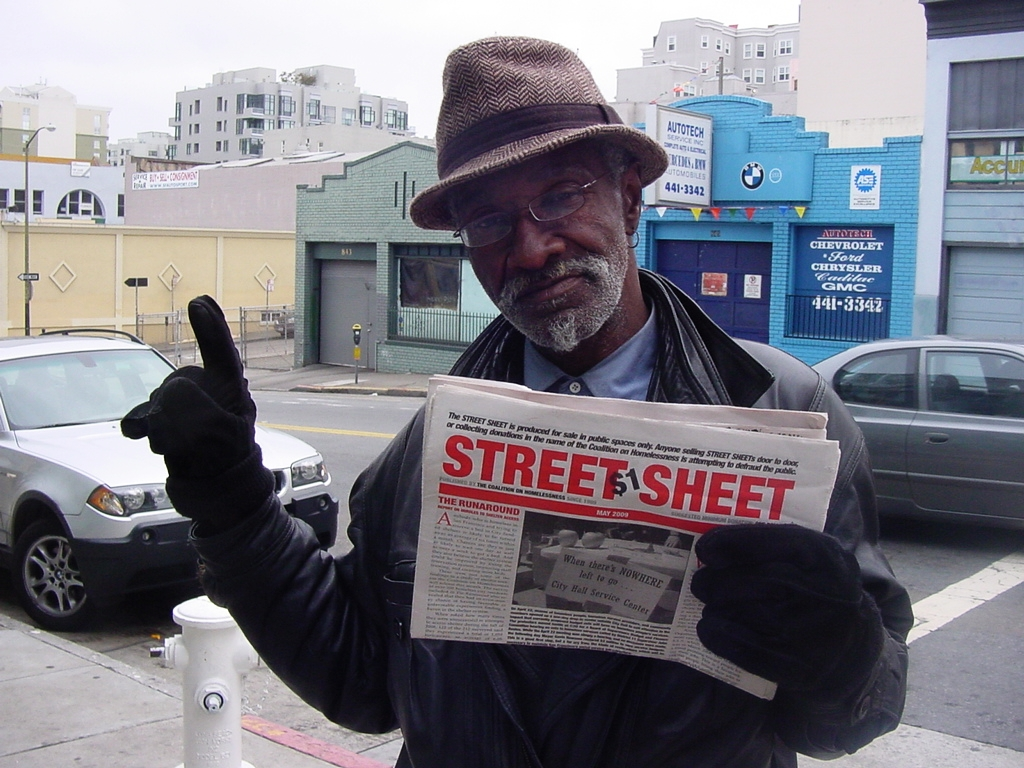
A man selling the Street Sheet

Africa

- The Big Issue Malawi

Asia

- The Jeepney Magazine
- The Big Issue (Australia)

Europe

- Aluma, Sweden
- Arts of the Working Class
- Augustin, Austria
- The Big Issue, United Kingdom
- The Big Issue in Scotland
- Cais, Portugal
- Dik Manusch, Sweden
- Faktum, Sweden
- Fedél Nélkül, Hungary
- Hinz&Kunzt (Hamburg), Germany
- Hus Forbi, Denmark
- Iso Numero (fi)
- Kralji ulice (transl. Kings of the street) Ljubljana, Slovenia
- Megaphon Austria
- Nota Bene (magazine)
- Nový prostor Czech Republic
- Put Domoi St. Petersburg & Ukraine
- Scarp de' tenis Italy
- Shedia (Σχεδία)
- Situation Sthlm Sweden
- Surprise Switzerland

North America

- The Bridge
- The Challenger Newspaper, Austin, Texas
- Change of Heart, Lawrence, Kansas
- The Cleveland Street Chronicle
- The Contributor, Nashville, Tennessee
- The Denver Voice, Denver Colorado
- The Dominion
- Edmonton Street News, Edmonton
- Groundcover News, Ann Arbor, Michigan
- The Homeless Voice, Florida
- Hobo News, St. Louis and Cincinnati
- Homeless Grapevine, Cleveland
- The Journey (street newspaper), Fort Worth, Texas
- The Ottawa Wrench
- Real Change, Seattle, Washington
- Spare Change News, Greater Boston
- Streetvibes, Cincinnati
- Street News, New York City
- Street Roots, Portland, Oregon
- Street Sense, Washington, D.C.
- Street Sheet, San Francisco
- Street Sheet (Wilmington), Wilmington, North Carolina
- Street Sheet Canada, founded by Rodney Graham in Winnipeg, Manitoba
- Street Sights, Providence, Rhode Island
- Street Speech, Columbus, Ohio
- Street Spirit, Oakland, California
- StreetWise, Chicago, Illinois
- STREETZine, Dallas, Texas
- Toronto Street News, Toronto
- Word on the Street, Baltimore

== See also ==
- International Network of Street Papers
  - Street News Service
- North American Street Newspaper Association
