= The Contributor (newspaper) =

Bi-weekly street newspaper

- The June 2010 front page of The Contributor
- Type: Twice-monthly street publication
- Format: Newspaper
- Founder(s): Steven Samara, Tasha French, Tom Wills, and Will Connelly
- Editor: Amanda Haggard, Linda Bailey
- Founded: 2007
- Political alignment: Homeless advocacy
- Circulation: 20,000 monthly
- Website: thecontributor.org

The Contributor is a bi-weekly street newspaper published in Nashville, Tennessee, United States. The publication's content focuses on primarily social justice issues as they are framed by politics, music, art, culture, sports, homelessness and poverty. It is written by local journalists as well as people experiencing homelessness or working within the homeless community. The magazine's editors are Amanda Haggard and Linda Bailey.

As an organization, The Contributor is a nonprofit social enterprise providing economic opportunity with dignity to people experiencing or who have experienced homelessness and poverty. Every two weeks, a new issue of The Contributor is published and sold by over 150 vendors in Middle Tennessee. By signing a contract and attending training, Contributor vendors become independent micro-business men and women who invest in their own micro-businesses by purchasing papers for $.50 and selling them for $2.00 plus tips to the public. They become Contributors to the economy, to their own quality of life, and to the community. The organization's executive director is Will Connelly.

== History ==
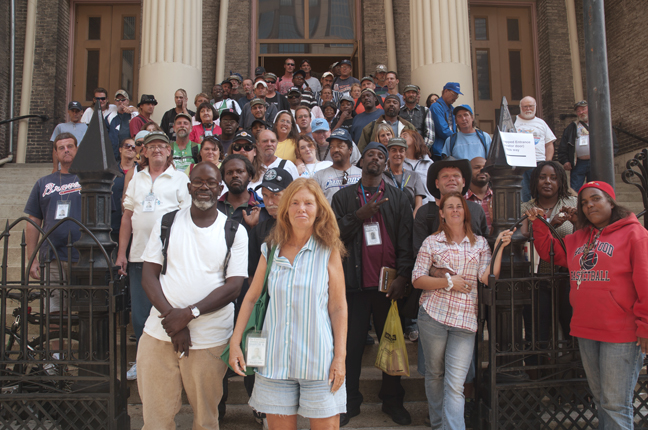
Some of the more than 400 homeless and formerly homeless vendors of The Contributor.

The Contributor was established as a newspaper in 2007 by a core group of volunteers. The first issue was published in November of that year and had a circulation of about 800 copies. The paper publishes consistently on a twice monthly basis and expanded its circulation and vendor network to become one of the highest-circulating street newspaper of its kind in North America

In 2010, The Contributor received 501(c)(3) status, becoming an independent non-profit organization. One of the founders of The Contributor, Tasha French, received the Tennessee Titans Community Quarterback award for their volunteer efforts with the paper. The award came with a $10,000 grant.

Since 2009, more than 3,200 different vendors have purchased $2,300,000 worth of The Contributor and sold over 6 million copies, generating over $15,000,000 in legitimate income for themselves. With verified paper purchases, income can be extrapolated to apply for subsidized or traditional housing. As a result, over 70% of the vendors who have vended with us for six months or more have obtained housing. The Contributor is one of many street publications in the United States. Others include Real Change in Seattle, Washington and Spare Change News in Boston, Massachusetts. Many of these vendors have moved onto other more traditional employment.

== Affiliations ==
The Contributor is a member of the North American Street Newspaper Association and the International Network of Street Papers.

== See also ==
- List of street newspapers
