= Toronto Street News =

Street newspaper based in Toronto

Toronto Street News is a street newspaper based in Toronto, Ontario, Canada. It is distributed on the streets of Toronto by the homeless, handicapped and underemployed in exchange for a donation. First published around the turn of the millennium, it has attracted controversy for publishing antisemitic material. The Website expired likely sometime in April 2024.

== Owner and content ==
The Toronto Street News is edited and published by Victor Fletcher, who describes himself as a "one-man charity" and a "hands-on reporter". Originally trained as a watchmaker, he later worked for defense contractors and, he has said, "realized that the world is controlled by a cabal of Masons and Zionists". Fletcher states that "I don't like people being ripped off, especially at the bottom end of society".

In an interview with the National Post in 2008, Fletcher stated that "For a homeless paper, I can get away with it, and have done that for ten years ... I have the rare luxury of sounding off any way I want. I'm just amazed that people go out there and buy it. If they didn't want to buy the paper, they can give the homeless guy two bucks. But they don't, they want the paper, so there is an audience out there. It's amazing to me." According to Fletcher, his audience consists of "upscale communities and a lot of women."

One of the newspaper's writers and distributors is Angel Femia-Richmond, who supports Fletcher and defends the paper, stating: "Some of the articles are very controversial, but it's the truth ... He pushes whatever he can push, whatever people aren’t paying attention to. He gets real upset sometimes."

Fletcher, who is strongly anti-Zionist, stated that "I can’t walk down the street without the Masonic thing all over me, you know? They control 680 News.”

== Criticism and controversy ==
The Southern Poverty Law Center has described the newspaper as "anti-Semitic" and "conspiracy-mongering".

The conservative National Post has sharply criticized the paper, which author Joseph Brean described as Toronto's "most prominent vehicle for hate propaganda, outrageous conspiracy theories, blatant plagiarism and libellous personal attacks, though virtually nothing about the homeless, all published at the whim of a man who lives a two-hour drive away in Ontario's farm-belt."

Brean cited several articles published by the paper, including a claim Liberal party member Bob Rae had secretly changed his name from "Levine" (to conceal the fact that he is actually Jewish) and a claim that Canadian Prime Minister Stephen Harper's real birthday is the same as Adolf Hitler, which the paper claimed "looks good on a resume" for "New World Order types". Brean said that the Street News editor had apologized for an article that advocated killing "jew bankers".

The paper has also been sharply criticized by Barbara Hall, chief commissioner of the Ontario Human Rights Commission from 2005 to 2015, and by Mel Sufrin, who served as executive secretary of the Ontario Press Council (OPC) for 23 years until 2010, who stated that the paper "fails almost every conceivable test for membership" in the OPC. The Canadian Jewish Congress is also critical of the paper, and in 2007 filed a human rights complaint after the paper published an article originally written by Hal Turner, which called for the murder of "jew bankers." Fletcher was later forced to concede that this article was "an illegal incitement to genocide against Jews."

== See also ==
- International Network of Street Papers
- North American Street Newspaper Association
