= The Bridge (newspaper) =

American street newspaper

- Type: Monthly street newspaper
- Format: Tabloid
- Founder(s): James Ekenstedt, Evan Katz, Caroline Ponseti
- Editor: Chris
- Founded: 2013
- Political alignment: Homeless advocacy
- Circulation: 5,000
- Website: www.thebridge901.com/our-mission

The Bridge is an American street newspaper that aims to give people who are currently or formerly homeless an opportunity for self-expression and sustainable income. The Bridge trains and certifies people with experiences of homelessness to be independently contracted vendors of the paper. They purchase each paper for 25 cents and sell it on the street for one dollar, keeping 100% of the profit.

== History ==
The paper launched in March 2013 in Memphis, Tennessee as a monthly, 16-page paper that focuses on issues of homelessness. The content features art and writing by homeless individuals and is supplemented by articles by staff writers.

The paper was founded by James Ekenstedt, Caroline Ponseti and Evan Katz during their sophomore year at Rhodes College. It is the first street newspaper run entirely by college students.

== Affiliations ==
The Bridge is a member of the North American Street Newspaper Association and the International Network of Street Papers.
