= Street Spirit (newspaper) =

Street newspaper in Bay Area California

- Type: Monthly street newspaper
- Owner(s): Youth Spirit Artworks (since 2017)
- Founder(s): Sally Hindman; Terry Messman
- Founded: 1995
- Headquarters: Berkeley, California, U.S.
- Circulation: 10,000 (as of 2019)
- Website: thestreetspirit.org

Street Spirit is a monthly newspaper based in the San Francisco Bay Area, focusing primarily on issues related to homelessness and poverty. Established in 1995 by the American Friends Service Committee in Oakland, California, the newspaper aims to provide coverage of issues affecting homeless and low-income communities.

== History ==
Street Spirit was co-founded by Sally Hindman, a homeless activist and Quaker, and Terry Messman, who proposed the idea to the American Friends Service Committee (AFSC) in 1995. The newspaper was created to report on issues related to homelessness in Alameda County and the broader East Bay Area. It covers topics related to homelessness that are often not extensively covered by mainstream media, such as housing policy, urban planning, and first-person stories and editorials written by homeless people.

In July 2016, AFSC announced budget cuts that would end its funding for the newspaper. Founder Sally Hindman, who had become the executive director of the non-profit organization Youth Spirit Artworks (YSA), arranged for the non-profit to take over the publication. This transition included integrating the paper into YSA's youth enrichment program. Homeless and low-income youths aged 16–25 became involved in the paper's production, including vocational training in art, writing, marketing, social services, and entrepreneurship.

Terry Messman continued to lead editorial efforts until mid-2018 when he retired. Following his departure, Alastair Boone, a former writer for the Daily Californian and an editorial fellow for CityLab, was hired as the new editor-in-chief. As funding was limited under YSA leadership, Boone was the only full-time staff member, working from YSA's small office on Adeline Street in Berkeley.

On June 30, 2023, Street Spirit halted publication due to loss of funding from YSA, after the non-profit decided to scale back its offerings to focus on its own programming for homeless youth. The Western Regional Advocacy Project (WRAP) stepped in as a fiscal sponsor to assist with fundraising efforts, and San Francisco's Street Sheet printed extra copies for Street Spirit vendors to sell in the interim.

Street Spirit announced its return to print in March 2024. The paper's team raised over $250,000 from individual donors, securing funding for operations through the end of 2024.

== Content and Mission ==
The newspaper covers a range of topics related to homelessness and poverty. Its content includes reports on local protests and city measures affecting the homeless, as well as personal stories from community members. The publication also features poetry, haikus, and stories of individuals and organizations supporting the homeless. Street Spirit reports on events and issues in locations such as shelters, soup kitchens, and low-income housing.

The newspaper's stated mission is to inform readers about issues related to homelessness and poverty, and to encourage social action. Through its reporting, Street Spirit discusses the realities of poverty and examines policy issues related to homelessness, including debates around supportive housing and law enforcement approaches.

In 2019, Street Spirit joined the international street newspaper community by attending a summit organized by the International Network of Street Newspapers, a Scotland-based organization that supports more than 100 street newspapers in 34 countries with a combined readership of over 5 million. This connection has led to the inclusion of international stories about homelessness and poverty in the paper.

The newspaper's motto is "Justice News and Homeless Blues in the Bay Area."

== Distribution ==
Street Spirit typically prints about 10,000 copies a month and is distributed by more than 100 vendors, most of whom are homeless, in Berkeley, Oakland, and other East Bay cities. Vendors sell the newspaper for $2 a copy. The top vendor in the best of times could sell 400-800 papers a month, potentially earning up to $1,200. However, most vendors reported making about $20 a day. The newspaper's vendor coordinator also provides snacks, free socks, meal referrals, and manages a P.O. box service for homeless individuals.

=== Books and Multimedia ===
Street Spirit distributes books, novels, and documentaries via its vendor distribution network. In May 2016, DVD copies of Dogtown Redemption, a PBS documentary about West Oakland recyclers, was sold alongside the newspaper. In 2019, journalist Rick Paulas donated 280 copies of his self-published novel "Eastern Span" to Street Spirit, and vendors were given the option to sell the book alongside the newspaper, with the freedom to set their own price and keep all proceeds. The project proved successful, with one vendor reportedly selling 40 copies of the book within 10 days, at prices ranging from $5 to $10, and higher. Paulas stated goal was to encourage empathetic moments between vendors and customers.

In November 2023, to help raise funds to resume publication after the loss of YSA funding, Street Spirit printed an illustrated book titled "The Eviction Machine," by UC Berkeley student Vinay Pai, documenting the life of housing rights activist William Barclay Caldeira (known popularly as "300").

== Cultural Impact ==
The Berkeley-born rapper Lil B, known for his prolific output and positive philosophy, released a song titled "Street Spirit Newspaper" in 2020, citing the publication as an integral part of Berkeley culture alongside landmarks like Telegraph Avenue and the Ashby Flea Market. In an interview with Street Spirit, Lil B described the newspaper as representing "dignity" and "promotion and marketing with love," highlighting its significance in the local community.

Street Spirit has been referenced in other academic and artistic works, such as Frank Wilderson III's 2004 film "Reparations... Now," in which one of the film's subjects, Caroline, asked to be interviewed while selling Street Spirit on the street.
