= Street Sense =

Street Sense may refer to:

- Street Sense (horse), a Thoroughbred race horse, winner of the 2007 Kentucky Derby
- Street Sense (newspaper), a Washington, D.C.–based street newspaper
