= NEA Jazz Masters =

National Endowment for the Arts awards

The National Endowment for the Arts (NEA) every year honors up to seven jazz musicians with Jazz Master Awards. The National Endowment for the Arts Jazz Masters Fellowships are the self-proclaimed highest honors that the United States bestows upon jazz musicians. The award is usually given late in a performer's career after they have long established themselves.

== NEA Jazz Masters ==
List adapted from the National Endowment for the Arts website.

- 1982: Roy Eldridge, Dizzy Gillespie, Sun Ra
- 1983: Count Basie, Kenny Clarke, Sonny Rollins
- 1984: Ornette Coleman, Miles Davis, Max Roach
- 1985: Gil Evans, Ella Fitzgerald, Jo Jones
- 1986: Benny Carter, Dexter Gordon, Teddy Wilson
- 1987: Cleo Patra Brown, Melba Liston, Jay McShann
- 1988: Art Blakey, Lionel Hampton, Billy Taylor
- 1989: Barry Harris, Hank Jones, Sarah Vaughan
- 1990: George Russell, Cecil Taylor, Gerald Wilson
- 1991: Danny Barker, Buck Clayton, Andy Kirk, Clark Terry
- 1992: Betty Carter, Dorothy Donegan, Harry "Sweets" Edison
- 1993: Milt Hinton, Jon Hendricks, Joe Williams
- 1994: Louie Bellson, Ahmad Jamal, Carmen McRae
- 1995: Ray Brown, Roy Haynes, Horace Silver
- 1996: Tommy Flanagan, Benny Golson, J. J. Johnson
- 1997: Billy Higgins, Milt Jackson, Anita O'Day
- 1998: Ron Carter, James Moody, Wayne Shorter
- 1999: Dave Brubeck, Art Farmer, Joe Henderson
- 2000: David Baker, Donald Byrd, Marian McPartland
- 2001: John Lewis, Jackie McLean, Randy Weston
- 2002: Frank Foster, Percy Heath, McCoy Tyner
- 2003: Jimmy Heath, Elvin Jones, Abbey Lincoln
- 2004: Jim Hall, Chico Hamilton, Herbie Hancock, Luther Henderson, Nat Hentoff, Nancy Wilson
- 2005: Kenny Burrell, Paquito D'Rivera, Slide Hampton, Shirley Horn, Artie Shaw, Jimmy Smith, George Wein
- 2006: Ray Barretto, Tony Bennett, Bob Brookmeyer, Chick Corea, Buddy DeFranco, Freddie Hubbard, John Levy
- 2007: Toshiko Akiyoshi, Curtis Fuller, Ramsey Lewis, Dan Morgenstern, Jimmy Scott, Frank Wess, Phil Woods
- 2008: Candido Camero, Andrew Hill, Quincy Jones, Tom McIntosh, Gunther Schuller, Joe Wilder
- 2009: George Benson, Jimmy Cobb, Lee Konitz, Toots Thielemans, Rudy Van Gelder, Snooky Young
- 2010: Muhal Richard Abrams, George Avakian, Kenny Barron, Bill Holman, Bobby Hutcherson, Yusef Lateef, Annie Ross, Cedar Walton
- 2011: Hubert Laws, David Liebman, Johnny Mandel, Orrin Keepnews, and the Marsalis Family (Ellis Marsalis Jr., Branford Marsalis, Wynton Marsalis, Delfeayo Marsalis, and Jason Marsalis)
- 2012: Jack DeJohnette, Von Freeman, Charlie Haden, Sheila Jordan, Jimmy Owens
- 2013: Mose Allison, Lou Donaldson, Lorraine Gordon, Eddie Palmieri
- 2014: Jamey Aebersold, Anthony Braxton, Richard Davis, Keith Jarrett
- 2015: Carla Bley, George Coleman, Charles Lloyd, Joe Segal
- 2016: Gary Burton, Wendy Oxenhorn, Pharoah Sanders, Archie Shepp
- 2017: Dee Dee Bridgewater, Ira Gitler, Dave Holland, Dick Hyman, Lonnie Smith
- 2018: Pat Metheny, Dianne Reeves, Joanne Brackeen, Todd Barkan
- 2019: Bob Dorough, Abdullah Ibrahim, Maria Schneider, Stanley Crouch
- 2020: Dorthaan Kirk, Bobby McFerrin, Roscoe Mitchell, Reggie Workman
- 2021: Terri Lyne Carrington, Albert "Tootie" Heath, Phil Schaap, Henry Threadgill
- 2022: Billy Hart, Donald Harrison, Stanley Clarke, Cassandra Wilson
- 2023: Regina Carter, Kenny Garrett, Louis Hayes, Sue Mingus
- 2024: Gary Bartz, Terence Blanchard, Willard Jenkins, Amina Claudine Myers
- 2025: Marshall Allen, Marilyn Crispell, Chucho Valdés, Gary Giddins
- 2026: Rhonda Hamilton, Carmen Lundy, Airto Moreira, Patrice Rushen
