= Street News =

Street newspaper in New York city, now shut down

Street News was a street newspaper sold by homeless individuals in New York City. It was founded in 1989 by Hutchinson Persons and Wendy Oxenhorn, marking the beginning of the American street newspaper movement. The publication provided a means of self-sufficiency for many homeless and unemployed individuals in the city. The newspaper was initially sold for $1, with 25 cents allocated to cover operational costs and 75 cents retained as profit by the vendors.

== History ==
Street News began publication in October 1989, founded by its editor-in-chief, rock musician Hutchinson Persons, who was also the founder of Street Aid, along with Wendy Oxenhorn (then Koltun). The newspaper was funded through contributions from individuals and corporations, including Cushman & Wakefield, as well as revenue generated from advertising sales. Lance Primis, then-president of The New York Times, joined the organization's board of advisors and provided significant support.

=== Launching ===
Street News was launched with advertisements on subways and buses donated by the Metropolitan Transportation Authority. The homeless salesforce promoted Street News shortly after panhandling was declared illegal on the subways; however, vendors were permitted to sell the newspaper in areas surrounding metro train stations. Lee Stringer, a former homeless man and crack addict, was the newspaper's first vendor before becoming an editor and columnist. He is now a writer and works to inspire young people to avoid crime.

=== Growing business ===
Street News gained widespread media attention following the release of its first article, written by Sam Roberts for The New York Times. Sales quickly grew from an initial 50,000 copies to over one million copies sold within the first four months of publication. Celebrities such as Paul Newman, Liza Minnelli, and the Beach Boys contributed opinion pieces. The newspaper was sold for 75 cents, with vendors receiving 45 cents per copy (plus the first 10 copies free).

=== Problems ===
Co-founder Wendy Oxenhorn left Street News after its first year, citing "philosophical differences on how to run the organization," as reported in a New York Times article. The initial media and public excitement about the paper eventually waned, and the publication faced financial difficulties in the early 1990s. Some staff members left to start the short-lived Crossroads Magazine. In 1991, New York's Metropolitan Transportation Authority implemented a policy prohibiting the hawking of newspapers on the subways, leading to the arrest of vendors while working in their prime selling locations. This contributed to Street News's ongoing challenges.

After Hutchinson Persons left Street News, its printer, Sam Chen of Expedi Printing, became the new owner. Chen attempted to turn a profit from the publication, but financial problems persisted into the mid-1990s, exacerbated by changing public attitudes toward the homeless, low content, and efforts by the city to displace homeless individuals.

By the mid-1990s, Street News' sales had dropped significantly, and some predicted that the newspaper would cease publication. Janet Wickenhaver became its editor and associate publisher, revamping the struggling business by shifting the focus from celebrity content to more coverage of social issues. While the paper survived and revitalized, it never regained the circulation levels of its early months. As of 2002, the editor was John Levi "Indio" Washington Jr. Street News prints 3,000 copies of six issues per year, sold by 15 vendors who receive 75 cents from the $1.25 sale price.

=== Cancellation ===
Street News has since ceased publication. As of now, it is no longer an active publication, and New York City has no official street newspaper.

== Legacy ==
The creation of Street News quickly inspired the founding of many other street newspapers, including Chicago's StreetWise, Boston's Spare Change News, and the UK's The Big Issue. The publication has been called a "pioneer" of the street paper movement. Both Street News and The Big Issue have become prototypes for street newspapers worldwide.

== See also ==
- Wendy Oxenhorn
- North American Street Newspaper Association
- International Network of Street Papers
- Street newspaper
- The Doe Fund
- Coalition for the Homeless
- StreetWise
