= Change of Heart (newspaper) =

Change of Heart, A Street paper for and by the Homeless, Winter 2012, Vol 15, No 1

Change of Heart masthead from spring 2009

Change of Heart is a quarterly street newspaper produced and sold in Lawrence, Kansas. It was founded by Craig Sweets in late 1996. who says the idea of starting a street newspaper was given to him by Michael Stoops, the director of the National Coalition for the Homeless. The paper is a member of the North American Street Newspaper Association (NASNA), and is the only street newspaper in Kansas.

Like most street newspapers, it is written mostly by the homeless and is sold by homeless vendors; it has also been supported by a grant from the Ethics and Excellence in Journalism Foundation. The paper usually includes coverage of news and events relevant to the homeless community; editorials, poetry, stories, and artwork contributed by the homeless; a directories of resources for the homeless and ways that non-homeless readers can aid the homeless community.

The paper claims a readership of about 1200 per quarter. In 1999 the paper was named "Best New Street Newspaper in North America" by NASNA. At the time, the paper was a single page printed on both sides and published using local churches' photocopiers; today it is 10 pages long and has its own staff and computers.

== See also ==
- List of street newspapers
