= Alberta Street News =

Canadian newspaper

Alberta Street News, formerly Edmonton Street News, is a street newspaper in Edmonton, Alberta, Canada. It was established in 2002 and is distributed on the streets of Edmonton and, since August 2010 when Calgary Street Talk was discontinued, in Calgary, to the homeless, handicapped and underemployed in exchange for a donation.

Vendors purchased papers at 50 cents a copy in 2003.

In 2012, the name changed from Edmonton Street News to Alberta Street News.

== See also ==
- International Network of Street Papers
- North American Street Newspaper Association
