= Kralji Ulice =

Slovenian street newspaper

Kralji ulice
- Categories: Street newspaper
- Frequency: Monthly
- Circulation: 17.300 (yearly average, as of December 2021)
- First issue: 2005
- Company: Kralji ulice, društvo za pomoč in samopomoč brezdomcev
- Country: Slovenia
- Based in: Ljubljana
- Language: Slovenian
- Website: https://www.kraljiulice.org

Kralji ulice (transl. Kings of the street) is a Slovenian monthly street newspaper specialized on homelessness and related social issues. It is offered on the streets of Ljubljana and other Slovenian cities, mostly by the homeless, people at risk of homelessness and other people in social or economic distress. The goal of the newspaper is to offer them the opportunity to earn a legitimate income, thereby helping them to reintegrate into mainstream society. The newspaper is in part created by the very same people that offer it on the streets. It contains life stories, anecdotes, reflections, pictorial material, poems, professional articles, reports and other materials that illuminate homelessness in Slovenia from different angles.

The project started in 2004 when a group of students and researchers, mainly from the field of social pedagogy, began a research about the homeless in Ljubljana, spending 24 hours with the homeless people. The research led to the initiative of creating a street newspaper. The first issue of "Kings of the street" newspaper was sold on the streets of Ljubljana in June 2005 in 2,600 copies by 26 homeless. The newspaper later became a monthly and is now offered all across the country. The price of the newspaper is €1, half of it gets the publisher, the other half goes for printing and production costs.

== About the publisher ==
Kralji ulice (Kings of the street), Association for help and self-help of the homeless, is an independent non-governmental non-profit humanitarian organization, which was formally established in September 2005. It combines professionals dealing with homelessness and associated phenomena and individuals who experienced homelessness and associated social exclusion. In addition to the newspaper Kralji ulice, they also manage the daily distribution center, carry out field work among the homeless, programs of accommodation support and prevention of evictions, etc.
