= Shedia =

Greek street newspaper

Shedia is the only Greek street newspaper and a member of the International Network of Street Papers (INSP). It is published by the non-governmental organization "Diogenis NGO," which is a non-profit Civil Company established in early 2010 to support the efforts of homeless and socially excluded individuals in integrating or reintegrating into Society.

Shedia is the second street paper published in Greece, following a similar initiative in September 1998 with the magazine Dromologia, which ceased operation due to significant difficulties.

== Content ==
The magazine's content is varied and focuses on free, independent journalism, with an emphasis on optimism and humor.

== Distribution ==
Like all street newspapers worldwide, Shedia is not sold at regular newspaper distribution points but exclusively on city streets by accredited vendors: individuals who are homeless, unemployed, or otherwise living below the relative poverty threshold. Of the magazine's selling price (€4.00), 67.5% (€2.70) goes directly to the vendor (which includes direct earnings of €1.50 for the seller, €0.65 withheld for tax and stamp duty (20%+3.6%), and €0.56 for the EFKA (26.95%).

The first issue was released on February 27, 2013, in Athens, and since then, it has been published on the last Wednesday of each month in Athens, as well as in Thessaloniki since January 2014.

== Events ==
On February 7, 2015, fourteen well-known Greek artists, such as Eleftheria Arvanitaki and Foivos Delivorias, wore the distinctive red vest of Shedia vendors and became sellers for an hour in squares and busy spots in Athens. The event took place as part of the International Vendor Week celebrations. (Note: International Vendor Week takes place annually during the first week of February.)

From April 28 to May 10, 2015, a photography exhibition was held, showcasing eighty images of Athens captured by eight Shedia vendors with their cameras. The exhibition took place at the Stegi of Letters and Arts.

On June 2, 2015, Shedia, in collaboration with the Technopolis and the Municipality of Athens, organized a music concert for the third consecutive year at Technopolis in Gazi.

== Tours ==
Since September 2014, Shedia has launched the social initiative "Invisible Routes", inspired by similar tours organized by street magazines in other countries (Hamburg, Zurich, Basel, etc.). The tour guides are current and former homeless individuals, who share their personal experiences to connect the journey with life on the streets. The initiative aims to empower the guides and raise public awareness through their testimonies, offering a different perspective on the city and its people. The tours start from the magazine's offices in Metaxourgeio and include social support structures such as homeless shelters, rehabilitation centers, day centers, soup kitchens, etc.
