= Word on the Street (newspaper) =

Newspaper in Baltimore, Maryland, US

Word On the Street
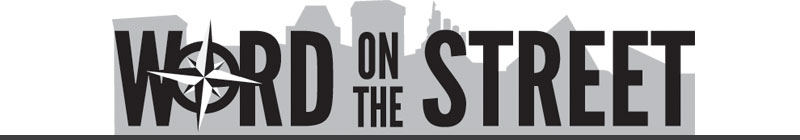
- Format: Street Newspaper
- Editor-in-chief: Mark Schumann
- News editor: Paul Behler, Leo Zimmermann
- Staff writers: Karen Aluisy, Robert Brashears
- Language: English
- Headquarters: Baltimore, Maryland
- Circulation: 5,000
- Sister newspapers: The Indypendent Reader
- Website: http://wordonthestreetbaltimore.org

Word On The Street was a street newspaper in Baltimore, Maryland.

The newspaper was managed "by people who have experienced homelessness in the past or are still surviving on the street." The organization aimed to have 75 percent of the content written by the homeless community.

Editor-in-Chief Mark Schumann experienced homelessness himself for many years.

== Vending ==
Word on the Street was sold by individuals for a suggested donation of $1. Each vendor then purchased new papers at 25 cents apiece.

== Affiliations ==
Word on the Street was a member of the North American Street Newspaper Association and International Network of Street Papers.
