= WLOY =

WLOY could refer to two radio stations in the United States:

- WLOY (AM), a broadcast radio station broadcasting at 660 kHz on the AM band, licensed to Rural Retreat, Virginia
- WLOY (Loyola University Maryland), a Part 15 radio station broadcasting at 1620 kHz on the AM band, from Loyola College in Baltimore, Maryland
