= ESN =

ESN may refer to:

- Eastern Security Network, the armed wing of the Indigenous People of Biafra (IPOB)
- Easton Airport (Maryland), United States
- Echo state network in computer science
- Edmonton Street News, a Canadian newspaper
- Educationally subnormal, term for special-needs students
- Einstein summation notation, used in mathematical physics
- Electronic serial number for mobile devices
- Emergency Services Network, in the UK
- Entertainment Studios Networks, an American cable network
- Erasmus Student Network, a European student organization
- Europe of Sovereign Nations, a far-right political group in the European Parliament
- European Sensory Network, studies the five senses
- European Society for Neurochemistry
- Salvadoran Sign Language
