= The Jeepney Magazine =

Filipino street newspaper

- Second 2009 issue
- Editor-in-chief: William Shaw
- Categories: Street newspaper
- Frequency: 6/year
- Circulation: 1500 copies/issue
- Publisher: Urban Opportunities for Change Foundation
- Country: Philippines
- Based in: Metro Manila
- Language: English
- Website: twitter.com/thejeepney/ facebook.com/jeepneymagazine/

The Jeepney Magazine is a street newspaper sold by poor and homeless people in the Philippines. It was launched in March 2008 with two purposes: to write for and about the poor, and to provide them with jobs to make a living. It is sold for 100 pesos, half of which the seller keeps. Selling 10 copies per day is expected to eventually let the sellers exceed the minimum wage by 40 percent. The Jeepney Magazine is published by the Urban Opportunities for Change Foundation and is a member of the International Network of Street Papers. The name refers to the jeepney, the most popular means of public transportation in the Philippines and a symbol of Philippine culture.

Jeepney Magazine is written in English, and a Tagalog translation is under consideration. It won the 2009 International Street Paper Award for Best Interview. The biggest challenge is finding safe and legal places where vendors can sell the magazine.
