= Das Megaphon =

Austrian newspaper

- Type: Street newspaper
- Founded: October 1995; 30 years ago
- Language: German
- Country: Austria
- Website: megaphon.at

Das Megaphon (lit. 'The Megaphone') is a street newspaper sold by homeless in Graz and other cities in Styria, Austria. It was started in October 1995 and is run by Catholic charity Caritas. The paper is published monthly with a circulation of about 13,000 copies. It is sold mostly by Nigerian and Liberian male refugees. Megaphon was one of the street papers initiating the Homeless World Cup in 2001 and hosted the first cup in 2003.

In 2004, Megaphon sponsored a lecture series aimed at improving homeless people's access to education; the program paid for university professors to give lectures in homeless shelters, and arranged for homeless individuals to have access to local university facilities.
