= The Big Issue (Australia) =

Australian magazine

- Categories: Entertainment and Current Affairs
- Frequency: Fortnightly
- Company: The Big Issue
- Country: Australia
- Language: English
- Website: thebigissue.org.au

The Big Issue in Australia is a street newspaper which began in 1996. The Australian edition of the paper is a project of the UK-based The Big Issue. The first magazine was launched in Australia on the steps of Melbourne’s Flinders Street railway station on 16 June 1996.

Since its founding in 1996, about 7,000 street vendors have sold more than 14 million copies of the magazine, collectively earning more than $40 million. Today, the magazine sells for $9.

At the paper's headquarters in Melbourne, the publication of each new edition includes a launch breakfast for local vendors. The editor then goes through what's in the edition and receives feedback from vendors.

== People ==
Steven Persson is the paper's CEO.

Amy Hetherington is the magazine's editor.

=== Vendors ===
In Australia, vendors are homeless, marginalised and disadvantaged people from a range of disadvantaged backgrounds, including those suffering from mental health conditions or drug addictions.

== Housing support project ==
In 2015 The Big Issue Australia founded a project called Homes for Homes, an initiative that will help raise an ongoing supply of new funding for social and affordable houses. The voluntary initiative encourages homeowners, property developers and banks to make a tax deductible donation of 0.1 per cent of their property price, at the time they sell. Funds raised through Homes for Homes are distributed to social housing providers to build properties based on the areas of greatest housing need.

== See also ==
- Homelessness in Australia
