= WLOY (Loyola University Maryland) =

College radio station of Loyola University Maryland

Coordinates: 39°20′45″N 76°37′30″W

- Baltimore, Maryland; United States
- Frequencies: 1620 MHz (Part 15); Internet radio
- Branding: WLOY

Programming
- Language: English
- Format: College radio

Ownership
- Owner: Loyola University Maryland

History
- Founded: March 15, 1975
- First air date: 2003

Links
- Website: wloy.org

WLOY Loyola Radio is a non-commercial college radio station owned and operated by Loyola University Maryland, broadcasting on 1620 AM (as a low-power unlicensed Part 15 signal), campus cable channels 3 and 35, and streaming on wloy.org, and iTunes, based in Baltimore and Timonium, Maryland. WLOY operates multiple synchronized transmission locations under Part 15 of the FCC regulations, as well as on the Internet via multiple radio formats.

== Founding ==
Campus radio at Loyola dates to 1975, when a carrier current AM station launched with the self-assigned identifier of WVLC, which was changed to WLCR in 1976; the operation closed in 1996 during renovations to the student center.

Loyola built new radio facilities in Bellarmine Hall in fall 2002 and relaunched student broadcasting as WLOY. The station began full-time operations on March 19, 2003, transmitting at 1620 kHz under FCC Part 15 and streaming online.

Early station leadership included operations manager John Devecka and first student general manager Bill Coveney.

== Programming and community outreach ==
The station schedules music, sports talk, old-time radio, and public-affairs programming hosted primarily by students. Community-focused shows include What Happens Next? (a children’s storytelling/literacy program) and Both Feet In (interviews about homelessness in Baltimore); the latter's work is profiled by Loyola Magazine.

In 2020 WLOY co-founded the International Local Music Exchange alongside KBVR (Oregon State), KCSU (Colorado State) and the College Radio Foundation, timed to World College Radio Day, to share curated sets of local artists among stations worldwide.

== Awards ==
- 2006: Best of Baltimore Baltimore City Paper - Best Local Music Radio Show - Shut Up I'm on the Radio
- 2009: National Finalist - National Student Production Awards - Best Station Promotion
- 2011: Top 25 College Radio Station, at the 2011 mtvU Woodie Awards
- 2011: Winner - National Student Production Awards - Best Community Involvement: What Happens Next? program
- 2011: Winner - National Student Production Awards - Best Podcast: Both Feet In program
- 2011: Winner - Associated Collegiate Press Best of Show - Best Podcast: What Happens Next?
- 2012: Top 10 College Radio Station, at the 2012 mtvU Woodie Awards
- 2013: Finalists - National Student Production Awards - Best Podcast, Best Regularly Scheduled Program (2 Finalist awards)
- 2013: Winner - National Student Production Awards - Best Feature – What Happens Next? program
- 2013: Winner - National Student Production Awards - Best Community Involvement – Word on the Street newspaper

== Associations ==
WLOY is a founding member of the Baltimore Community Radio Coalition, and carries programming produced by underrepresented communities within Baltimore City. As a member WLOY has contributed equipment, installation and training to the program in Dallas F. Nicholas Sr. Elementary School, among others. Material produced by Learning, Inc. and students at Dallas Nicholas airs Saturdays at noon and Sundays at 2pm as part of the community radio hour. In the summer of 2009 the station began a children's literacy program What Happens Next? which also airs as part of the community radio hour. In 2010 the station began airing Both Feet In: Conversations with people experiencing homelessness.

WLOY is a member of the College Broadcasters, Inc. and the Broadcast Education Association. Its Operations Manager is a full member of the Audio Engineering Society and the Society of Broadcast Engineers.

WLOY is an iTunes affiliated station and is listed in iTunes Radio under the College heading.

WLOY is a co-founder and financial supporter of Word On The Street (newspaper) a newspaper focused on the issues of homelessness and poverty in Baltimore

WLOY is a participant in College Radio Day and has served as the Maryland State HQ since the event's inception.

== See also ==
- Campus radio
- List of college radio stations in the United States
