= The Big Issue Malawi =

Magazine sold by the homeless in Malawi

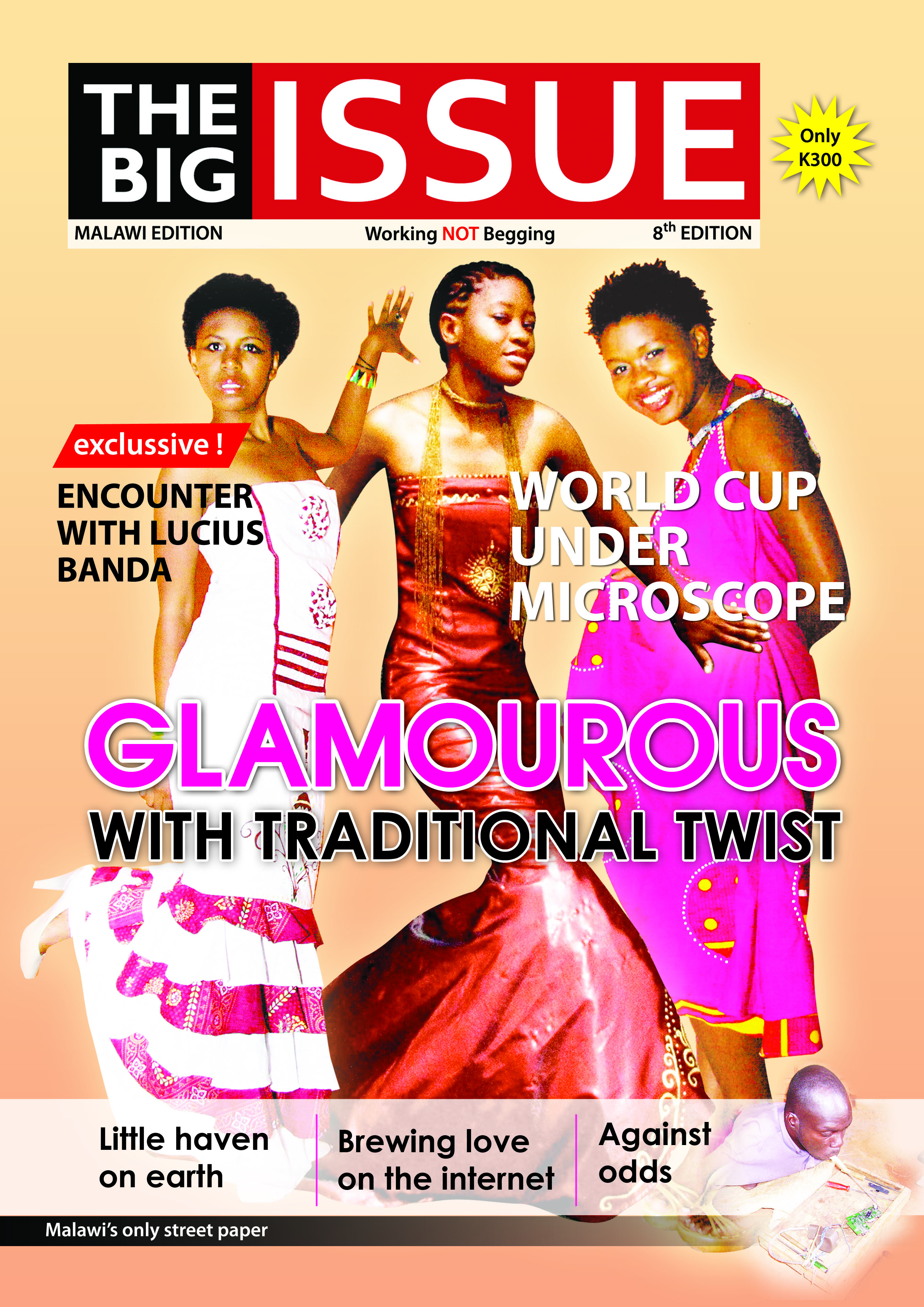
The Big Issue Malawi magazine, 8th edition

The Big Issue Malawi is a street paper in Malawi. It is a bimonthly magazine sold only by homeless individuals. The project's facilitator is a local charity known as the "Culture Awakening Society".

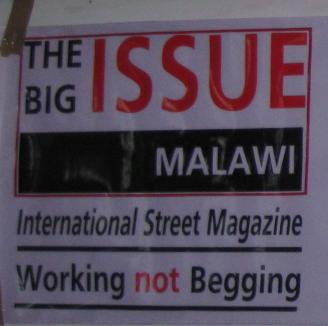
The Big Issue Malawi Slogan

The Big Issue Malawi project started on 24 January 2009 with the first issue of the magazine coming out in January 2009. The founder and current Executive Chairman of the project, Dr. John Chikago, imported the street paper concept from Japan, where he was working as Malawi's ambassador. He said that he was fascinated by the experience of The Big Issue Japan and decided to establish a similar project in Malawi.

== The magazine ==
The Big Issue Malawi is currently sold in the main Malawian cities: Lilongwe, Blantyre, Zomba, Mzuzu and Karonga. In July 2010 its circulation accounted to 2000 copies. The language of the magazine is both English and Chichewa, a Bantu language widely spoken in Malawi.

Vendors buy the magazine for 150 Kwacha (around 1 USD) and sell it for 300 Malawian Kwacha. They are trained in business management skills and sign a code of conduct outlining rules they must adhere while selling the magazine (including no begging, no drinking, no swearing and no harassment of the public) and are issued an official identity card. Vendors wear identifying bright reflectors. As of 2010, approximately 200 people have been recruited; the majority of whom are women.

== Funding ==
The Big Issue Malawi receives funding through the Scottish Government's International Development Fund, who are supporting the project with a three-year grant of £93000 GB sterling (starting in 2009). The publication is produced with the assistance of the United Nations Democracy Fund. It has also received financial support from Ubuntu Trading, the company the produces the fair trade version of Coke.

The magazine has its head offices in Blantyre and regional office in the Lilongwe.

The Malawian street paper belongs to the International Network of Street Papers (INSP) and it is affiliated to The Big Issue of London. Malawi has become the sixth country in Africa to introduce the magazine.

== Timeline ==
- 24 January 2009: The Big Issue Malawi magazine is launched
- January 2010: Lameck Masina is appointed as Chief Editor
- February 2010: Scotland's Minister for External Affairs, Fiona Hyslop, meets the Big Issue Malawi′'s staff, board and vendors in the headquarters in Blantyre.
- June 2010: Omega Chanje-Mulwafu is the new executive director at The Big Issue Malawi.
- July 2010: Shoe manufacturing firm Bata Shoe Company donates jackets and reflectors to more than 60 vendors.
- July 2010: Islamic charity Gift of Givers Foundation donates 120 blankets to vendors of The Big Issue Malawi street magazine.
