= The Homeless Voice =

American homeless advocacy center

The Homeless Voice is an American homeless advocacy center that operates out of Florida. It was founded by Sean Cononie and runs a street newspaper by the same name. The center also ran a homeless shelter in Hollywood, Florida that closed in 2015.

== Newspaper ==
The Homeless Voice used as a fundraising tool for the COSAC Foundation to help employ their homeless clients. In 2008, newspaper sales totaled $985,698. COSAC collected $410,000 in other donations, bringing the total revenue to nearly $1.4 million. In an interview with NBC, Sean Cononie (founder of the Homeless Voice) claimed that "The Homeless Voice revenue helps cover the cost of food, shelter and social services for more than 400 men, women and children each month".

Paper vendors are typically homeless and sell the newspaper as a temporary job.

The current Editor-in-Chief of the paper, as of March 2020, is Andrew Fraieli.

== Shelters ==
The Homeless Voice shelter was opened in Hollywood, Florida in 2002. The building formerly served as a hotel for nudists and was renovated in order to serve as a homeless shelter. The shelter was met with a mixed reception and received complaints that the shelter was a zoning violation and an eyesore. In 2015 Cononie agreed to let the city purchase the shelter and several of his other properties, and in March of the same year moved the shelter's residents to a low-income hotel in Haines City. The hotel, billed as the Stay Plus Inn (a former Howard Johnson's), has faced claims that it was taking advantage of the homeless by taking the majority or entirety of their limited income, which kept them from saving for the future. Cononie has responded that it was common for shelters to request that its residents pay a program fee.

In early 2016, Cononie agreed to sell the Polk County location. According to the Homeless Voice's own website, in 2017, they opened a facility, called "Motel 8" in Lake City.
