= Street Sheet =

San Francisco newspaper

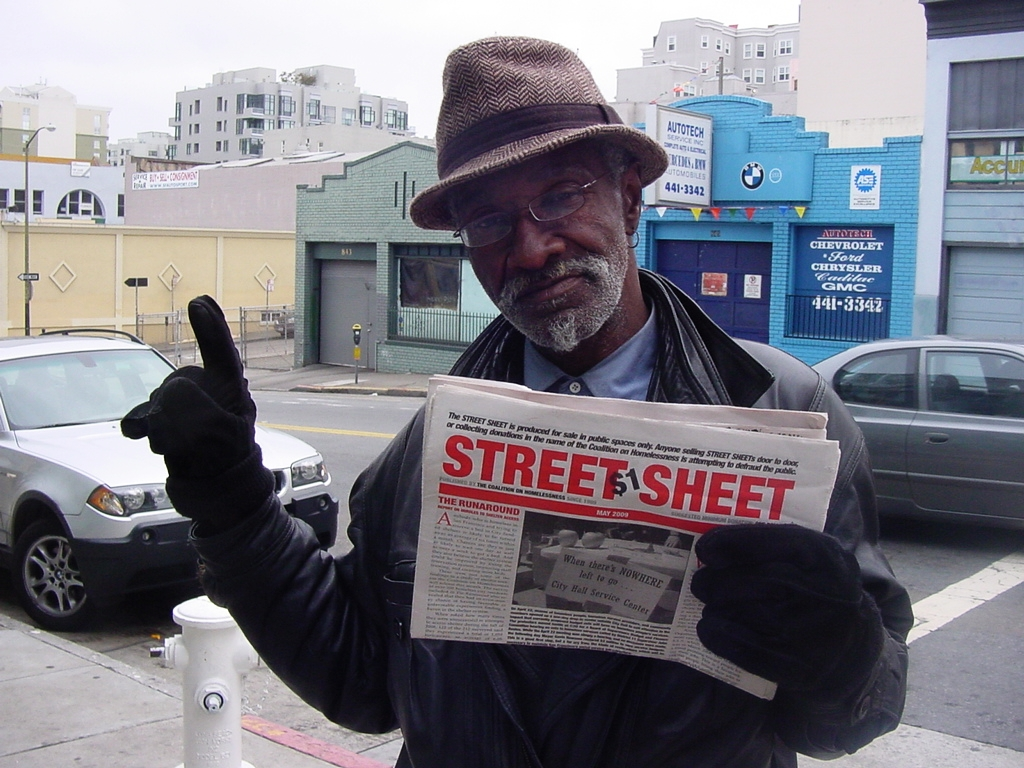
- Type: Twice monthly newspaper
- Format: Tabloid
- Owner(s): Coalition on Homelessness
- Publisher: Coalition on Homelessness
- Editor: Quiver Watts
- Founded: November, 1989
- Headquarters: San Francisco, California, U.S.
- Website: www.streetsheet.org

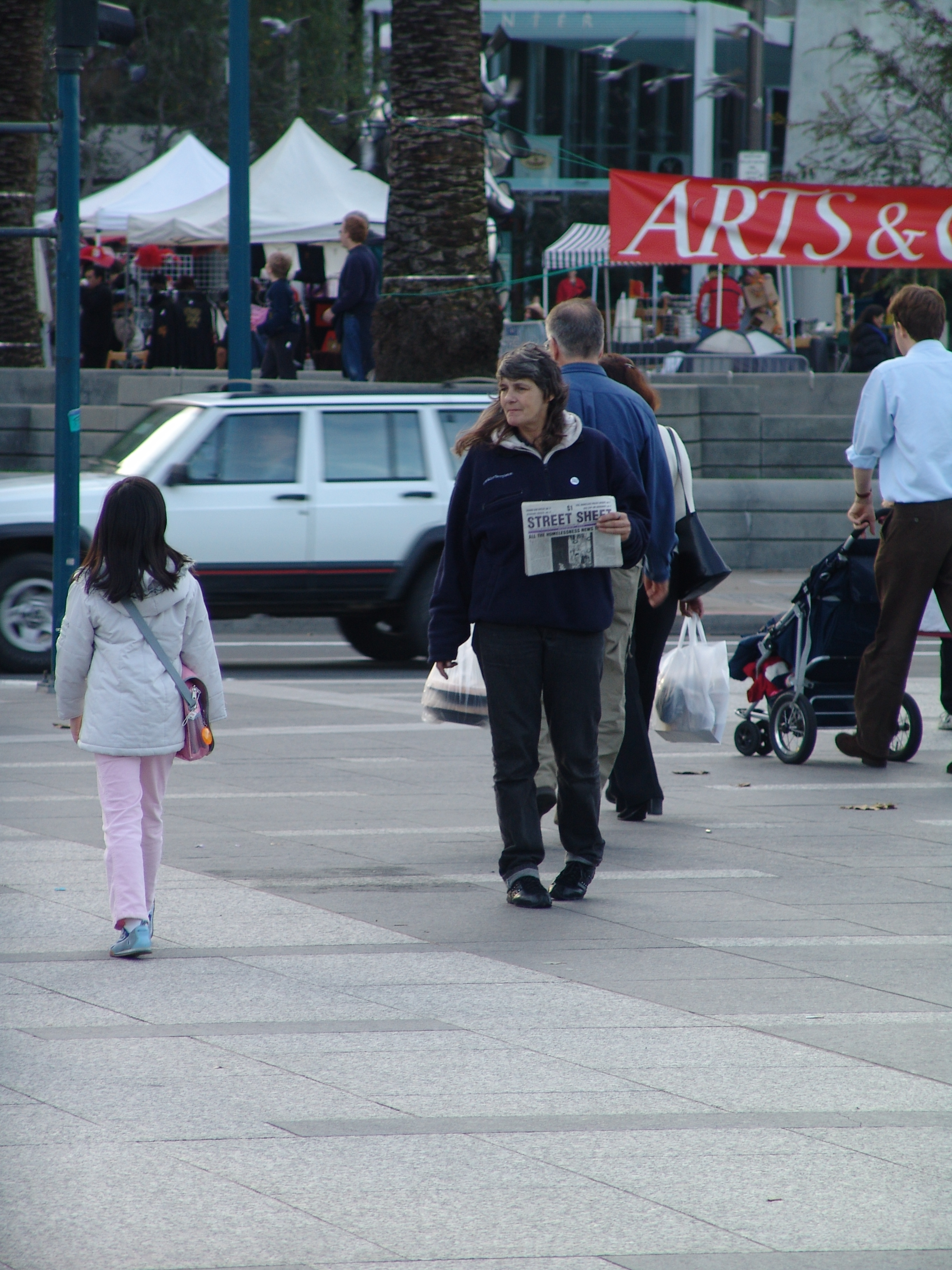
Saleswoman in San Francisco

The Street Sheet is a street newspaper published and sold in San Francisco, California which focuses on the problems of homeless people in the city, and on issues of poverty and housing. Founded in 1989, the Street Sheet is second only to the Street News as the oldest extant street newspaper in the United States and currently has the largest circulation of a street newspaper with 32,000 papers distributed monthly.

The Coalition on Homelessness publishes the newspaper, and vendors distribute the paper on the streets of San Francisco, usually in exchange for a two-dollar donation.

The millionth issue was sold in 1993.

== Reception ==
When juxtaposed with other street newspapers, Daniele Torck recognized The Street Sheet as being the only one to "give a wide platform to homeless person's protests and criticisms". Distribution of the paper as a means of empowering the homeless is not embraced by everyone. Critics claim that the language used in the paper overly relies on emotional appeal and the act of vending forces vendors to conform to stereotypes of homelessness.

== See also ==
- List of street newspapers
