= The Big Issue =

Street newspaper that supports homeless people

- The Big Issue
- UK Editor: Steven MacKenzie
- Categories: Entertainment and Current Affairs
- Frequency: weekly
- Circulation: 57,059 (as of 2022)
- First issue: September 1991
- Company: Big Issue Group
- Country: United Kingdom
- Based in: London, United Kingdom
- Language: English (UK Edition)
- Website: bigissue.com

The Big Issue is a British weekly street newspaper and social enterprise founded in September 1991 by John Bird and Gordon Roddick. It is sold by people experiencing homelessness or financial insecurity, who earn an income by buying magazines at a discounted wholesale price and selling them in public spaces.

The publication was created in response to rising levels of homelessness in the United Kingdom in the 1990s, and was modelled on Street News, a newspaper sold by homeless vendors in New York City. It is now the world's most widely circulated street newspaper.

== History ==
Gordon Roddick, the husband of The Body Shop founder Anita Roddick, was inspired to create a UK street paper after seeing Street News on sale in New York. He hired printer John Bird to run the paper, which launched in September 1991 using £500,000 of start-up capital by the Body Shop. Roddick had first met Bird in the 1960s in Edinburgh and hired him because of his lived experience of street homelessness. Bird and his deputy Phil Ryan came up with the name The Big Issue.

The Big Issue was initially published monthly but went fortnightly in September 1992, by which point an estimated £1m had been earned by homeless people across the UK. In June 1993, The Big Issue went weekly, which is still its publishing cadence today. With the national edition expanding beyond London, regional variants were established in Scotland, Wales, Northern England and South West England. In 1996, the first international variant of The Big Issue was published, The Big Issue Australia.

The Big Issue adopted a similar trading model to Street News and other street papers, with its vendors earning an income by purchasing copies from the publisher at a reduced price for resale to the public. The underlying trading model has remained largely unchanged since its launch in 1991. During the 2000s, eligibility to sell the magazine was extended beyond people experiencing homelessness to include anyone facing financial insecurity.

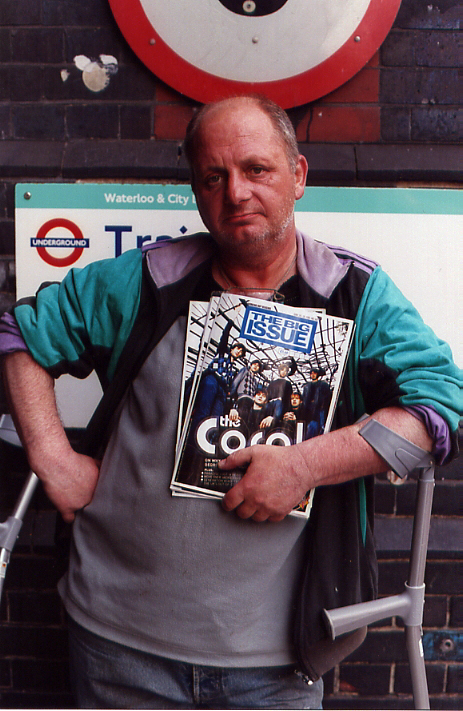
A seller of The Big Issue in London in 2005

In 1995, The Big Issue Foundation was founded to offer additional support and advice to vendors around issues such as housing, health, personal finance and addiction. Between 2007 and 2011, the circulation of The Big Issue declined from 167,000 to less than 125,000. It has since plummeted. Competition between vendors also increased at this time. From July 2011, the regional editions were merged into a single UK-wide magazine. In January 2012, the magazine was relaunched, with an increased focus on campaigning and political journalism. New columnists were added, including the Premier League footballer Joey Barton, Rachel Johnson, Mike Shinoda of Linkin Park and Samira Ahmed. The cover price was also increased.

In 2016, The Big Issue celebrated surpassing 200 million magazine sales. In September 2021, the magazine celebrated its 30th birthday.

== Ethos ==
The magazine is produced by the Big Issue Company Ltd. The company is a self-sustaining business that generates income through magazine sales and advertising revenues. Financially, The Big Issue is a social enterprise. The Big Issue Foundation is the registered charity arm of the organisation. It aims to underpin the company's work by tackling the underlying causes of homelessness.

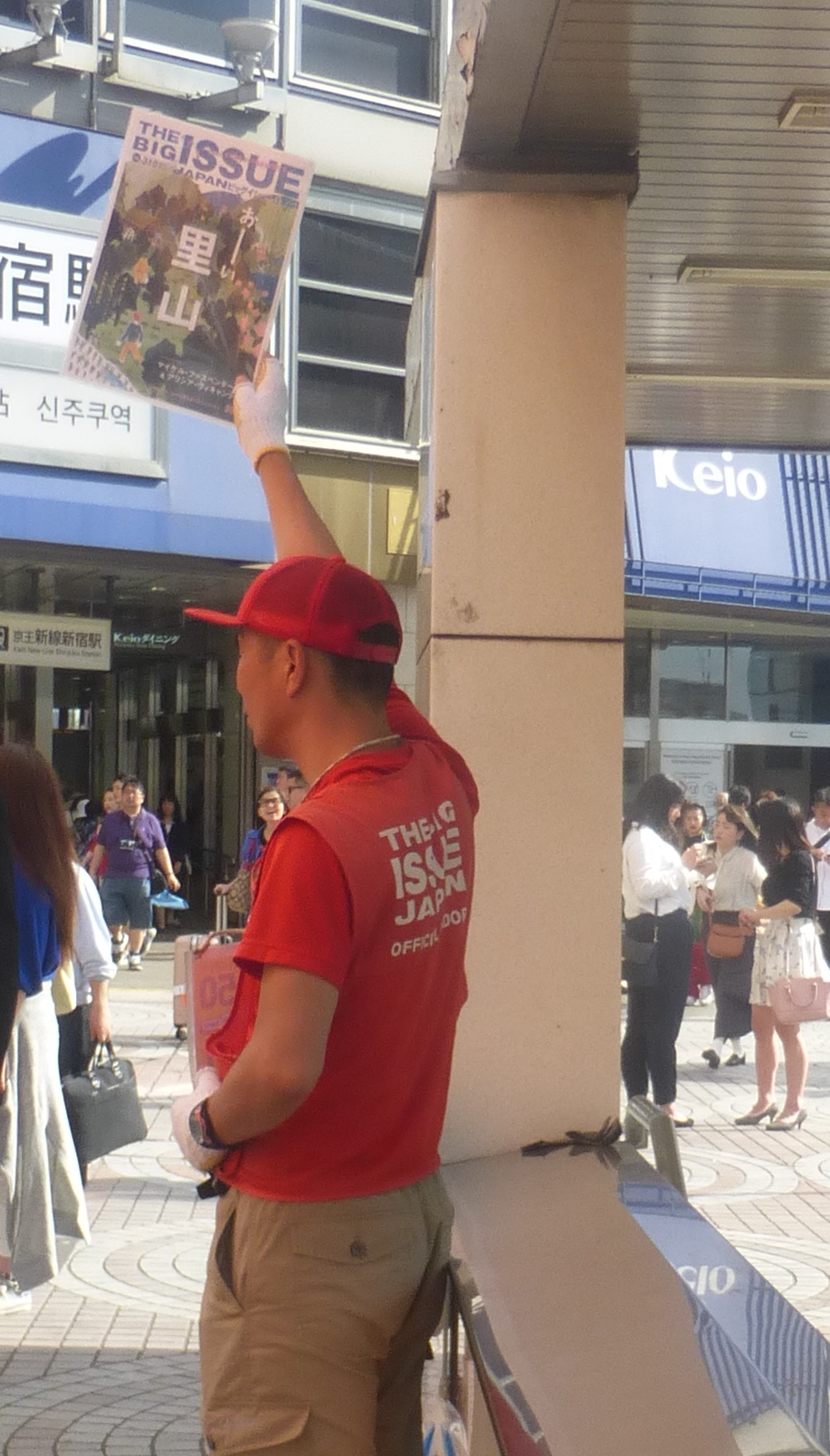
The Big Issue for sale in Japan, 2017

== Overseas projects ==
There are nine Big Issue projects by the same name in other nations.

- The Big Issue Australia (from June 1996)
- The Big Issue France (from October 1993): In France, a non-profit organisation named Big Issue France created with support from John Bird the magazine against exclusion called La Rue.
- The Big Issue Japan (from November 2003)
- The Big Issue Kenya (from 2007)
- The Big Issue Korea (from July 2010)
- The Big Issue Malawi (from 2009)
- The Big Issue Namibia
- The Big Issue The Republic of Ireland
- The Big Issue South Africa (from December 1996)
- The Big Issue Taiwan (from April 2010)
- The Big Issue Zambia (from 2007)

== Criticism ==
The Big Issue has been the centre of much controversy among publishers of street newspapers, mainly because of its business model. Publishers of some other street newspapers, especially in the United States, have criticised it for being overly "commercial" and having a flashy design. According to these critics, street newspapers ought to focus on covering political and social issues that affect the homeless, rather than emulating mainstream newspapers to generate a profit. Publishers of some smaller papers, such as Making Change in Santa Monica, California, said they felt threatened when The Big Issue began to publish in their area.

Other papers have also criticised The Big Issue for its professional production and limited participation by homeless individuals in writing and producing the newspaper. Others have stated that The Big Issue uses a successful business model to generate a profit to benefit the homeless, and its founder John Bird has said that it is "possible to be both profitable and ethically correct".

== Awards ==
- October 2004 – UN Habitat Scroll of Honour Award
- October 2008 – Ernst & Young Social Entrepreneur of the Year award

== See also ==
- Homelessness in the United Kingdom
- International Network of Street Papers
- Lucy Johnston
