= Wendy Oxenhorn =

American blues harmonica player

Wendy Oxenhorn a.k.a. "The Barefoot Baroness," is the founding director and vice chairman of the Jazz Foundation of America, co-founder of Street News, a Reverend, a blues harmonica player and an NEA Jazz Master.

== Early life ==
At the age of 14, Oxenhorn moved on her own to New York City, where she attended the School of American Ballet and danced with New York City Ballet.

When Oxenhorn was 17, a ballet career-ending knee injury drew her into depression when she was told by doctors that if she continued to dance, she would become crippled. This news prompted Oxenhorn to call a suicide hotline where she ended up consoling the counselor on the line, who was herself depressed. Oxenhorn started working at the suicide hotline three days later, thus beginning her career in the humanitarian arena.

== Career ==
In 1990, Oxenhorn co-founded the newspaper, Street News, with Hutchinson Persons, which provided employment and income for a homeless workforce. Oxenhorn recruited Fortune 500 CEOs and celebrities, built the infrastructure, marketing and fundraising for the organization, gaining coverage on the front pages of New York Times, Wall Street Journal, and Herald Tribune as well as appearing on talk shows including Regis and Kathy Lee, CBS Nightline, TODAY Show, and others. Recruited donors included Malcolm Forbes, Cyndi Lauper, Clive Davis, Ben & Jerry, Thomas Mosser, New York Times President Lance Primis, and then White House Chief of Staff, John H. Sununu. At its peak, Street News employed over 2000 homeless men and women in New York City and had a circulation of 250,000. It is credited with being the first homeless sold newspaper, inspiring as many as 150 similar newspapers in major cities throughout the world.

In 1994 Oxenhorn started a Board of Education approved public school program called Children of Substance. Children of Substance was a support group that helped middle school aged girls cope with drug addicted and alcoholic parents. The program gathered these 12-year-old girls who suffered from Bulimia and depression, incest or suicide attempts, and brought them together in small meetings with guest speakers who were adult children of alcoholic parents. These supportive meetings gave the girls the courage to say out loud what was happening to them, to bond with one another and to realize they were no longer alone.

Oxenhorn later began teaching herself blues harmonica on empty subway platforms late at night so she wouldn't wake her neighbors. She eventually started playing with an elderly blues man from Mississippi who regularly performed in the New York train stations. Oxenhorn quit her day job to play the blues full-time for over a year. She credits this experience, along with her non-profit background, with landing her position as Executive Director of the Jazz Foundation of America.

=== Jazz Foundation of America work ===
In 2000 Oxenhorn took over the executive directorship of the Jazz Foundation of America (JFA), which provides assistance to elderly professional jazz, blues and R & B musicians in need. At the time, the organization had $7,000 in its accounts and handled 35 clients per year. In 2001 Oxenhorn conceived and produced what became the major annual JFA fundraising event: "A Great Night in Harlem." Named after the famed Art Kane photograph, A Great Day in Harlem, Oxenhorn's Great Night in Harlem Concert at the Apollo Theater has been a hugely successful annual fundraising event, which would not have been possible without Lauren Roberts, a co-worker and Jarrett Lilien, the former E*TRADE president, who offered to bankroll the cost of the Apollo Theater and has since become the organization's President. The inaugural event was emceed by Gil Noble, and featured performances by dozens of prominent jazz musicians. The concert also helped attract prominent board members, including Quincy Jones, their current chairman; Richard Parsons, Agnes Varis, Elvis Costello, Danny Glover, Michael Novogratz and Lou Reed. The benefit concert raised $350,000 in its first year, 13 days after 9/11. Oxenhorn's fundraising efforts vastly expanded the program to over 500 cases per year and by 2005 the JFA became a national organization with a staff of four.

Oxenhorn's work at the JFA has included post-Katrina relief efforts for displaced musicians, re-housing and creating instant employment to hundreds of New Orleans musicians and their children, thanks to the support and generosity of Jarrett Lilien and E*TRADE and the famous Met Opera philanthropist Agnes Varis, who has since been known and loved the world over as "Saint" Agnes. Agnes Varis' support allowed Oxenhorn to create the Agnes Varis Jazz in the Schools Program. This program makes it possible for hundreds of elderly musicians to introduce jazz, blues and live music for the first time, to over 80,000 public school children a year. The Agnes Varis Program has kept hundreds of musicians afloat for the past ten years since Katrina, allowing them to pay their own rent. The Foundation's efforts are credited with bringing over 1000 displaced musicians back to New Orleans after Katrina by re-housing families and creating immediate employment. Oxenhorn also acquired over a quarter million dollars' worth of donated new top shelf instruments to replace what was lost in the flood for hundreds of NOLA's most beloved musicians. As human rights journalist, historian and jazz critic Nat Hentoff explained, "Wendy Oxenhorn launched Jazz in the Schools to also preserve the legacy of jazz by enlisting elder masters of jazz and blues who are in need of work to play educational performances introducing these public school children to jazz. Since then, the performances have included venues like children’s hospitals and nursing homes." Hentoff also writes: "Wendy Oxenhorn, the foundation's executive director—is the most determined, resilient, and selfless person I have ever known—she has emphasized to me "It's a privilege to be of service to people who spent a lifetime making our world so beautiful with their music and giving us all they had." Time Warner Inc. Chairman Richard D. Parsons said in an interview that Oxenhorn's ability to help artists quickly was a big factor in his decision to donate both his own money and corporate funds. ``On the basis of an article I read in the NY Times, I just sent the foundation a check, Parsons said, adding that he subsequently met Oxenhorn. ``She is `sui generis,' as we say in the law. She is one of a kind. When she sets her heart on something, she is fearless in pursuing it.

Actor Michael Imperioli, who got involved with the Jazz Foundation after being moved by the spirit of the foundation's work, believes that her role in the industry is thoroughly unique. "I’m surprised that she hasn’t been interviewed by Oprah Winfrey and lauded in some public way – not to single out any one person, but she deserves to be on that sort of platform," Imperioli told ABC News. "People should really know this person," Imperioli said. "She should get a Congressional Medal of Honor as far as I’m concerned. She gets an immense amount of joy from helping people. I’m a Buddhist, [and] in my religion, we call that a bodhisattva—someone who actually dedicates their lives to serving and helping others and that’s who she is."

Since 2001 Oxenhorn has generated over 70 million dollars and the organization now assists 7000 emergency assists a year and continues to save the homes and lives of thousands of musicians in crisis.

Awards and honors

Wendy Oxenhorn was honored for her humanitarian efforts on behalf of jazz and blues musicians at the 2004 Grammy Lunch by the Artist Empowerment Coalition (AEC), a non-profit coalition of artists, musicians, performers. Presented by Richard Parsons, CEO Time Warner, along with Prince, Roberta Flack, Mary J. Blige, Danny Glover, Russell Simmons and many other notables.

Wendy Oxenhorn was also honored for her efforts on behalf of jazz and blues musicians by SESAC, WBGO FM radio, Jazz Journalists Association and HBO during the premiere of "The Jazz Baroness" a documentary on the life of Nica Rothschild, who was noted for helping prominent jazz musicians, as a friend and patron in the 1950s and 1960s.

Ms. Oxenhorn is the first American as well as the first woman to be invited to join the board of the Montreux Jazz Festival's Artist Foundation in Switzerland.

Jazz at Lincoln Center recently bestowed the 2nd Annual Ashley Schiff Ramos Community Development Award to Wendy Oxenhorn. Ms. Oxenhorn's work at the Jazz Foundation serves as an inspiration to keep jazz and blues alive and to support the unique individuals in the jazz and blues community.

Greenhope Services for Women awarded Ms. Oxenhorn their Community Service Award on May 19, 2015. Ms. Oxenhorn was also their keynote speaker. Greenhope is a comprehensive residential, day treatment and outpatient program that works to rehabilitate and empower formerly incarcerated women and women referred as an alternative to prison.

The Franciscan Handmaids of the Most Pure Heart of Mary, Inc. (FHM), a Harlem-based order, one of only three orders of Black nuns in the United States, presented Ms. Oxenhorn with their Passion For Social Justice Award on March 29, 2016. Honorees this evening included: National Urban League President & CEO Marc H. Morial, the Honorable Charles B. Rangel, U.S. congressman and the Rev. Al Sharpton.

The National Endowment for the Arts presented Wendy at the Kennedy Center in Washington, D.C., with the 2016 NEA Lifetime Honors Jazz Masters award for her significant accomplishments in the field and for dedicating her life to assisting jazz and blues musicians in need.

The Scribes Institute for Literacy awarded Ms. Oxenhorn the Oprah Winfrey Award at the Martin Luther King Gala on January 15, 2017.

== Her home ==
Wendy lost her home The Tin Palace on Florida’s Sanibel Island, to Hurricane Ian.
