= Spare Change News =

Street newspaper for the Greater Boston Area

- The September 14, 2006 – September 27, 2006 cover page of Spare Change News
- Type: Biweekly newspaper
- Format: Tabloid
- Owner: Homeless Empowerment Project (HEP)
- Founder(s): Tim Harris, James Shearer, Tim Hobson, Bahati Ptah, and others
- Editor: Alejandro Ramirez (2016-); Adam Sennott (October 2015-2016); Sam Baltrusis (December 2014-October 2015); Joshua Eaton (June 2013-December 2014); Rev. Osagyefo Uhuru Sekou (August 2012-June 2013); Tom Benner (July 2011–August 2012); Adam Sennott (2010-2011); David J. Jefferson (2008-2010); Samuel J. Scott (2004-2007)
- Founded: May 8, 1992
- Language: English
- Headquarters: 1151 Massachusetts Avenue; Cambridge, Massachusetts 02138; United States
- Circulation: 10,000 per issue
- Website: sparechangenews.net

Spare Change News (SCN) is a street newspaper founded in 1992 in Boston, Massachusetts for the Greater Boston Area and published out of the editorial offices in Cambridge, Massachusetts through the efforts of the Homeless Empowerment Project (HEP), a grassroots organization created to help end homelessness.

The Homeless Empowerment Project is a 501(c)(3) not-for-profit corporation registered in the Commonwealth of Massachusetts, with an annual budget in 2012 of $130,000 and six staff members, all part-time.

The newspaper offices are headquartered in the Old Cambridge Baptist Church.

== Operation ==
Cover page of the premiere issue of Spare Change News, May 8, 1992 (cover photo by David P. Henry)

Since the founding of Spare Change News, the price of the newspaper has varied. Originally it was sold for $1 and the vendor paid 25 cents for a copy making a profit of 75 cents on each paper sold. As of September 2016, a vendor pays 50 cents for each copy of the paper, then sells it on the streets for $2. As a result, the vendor makes a $1.50 profit for each newspaper sold.

There are approximately 100 active vendors in the greater Boston area at any one time.

Circulation is roughly 10,000 per issue. HEP/SCN rely on grants and donations to publish the newspaper, but the organization works to increase its advertising revenue to become self-sufficient.

== History ==
The paper was started in Boston in 1992 and was the brainchild of Tim Hobson, who enlisted the aid of twelve other homeless people and one housed advocate, Timothy Harris, who was a member and executive director of Boston Jobs with Peace. In 1994, Harris would go on to use the model of Spare Change News and the Homeless Empowerment Project to found Real Change, a street newspaper in Seattle.

The first issue of Spare Change News was published on Friday, May 8, 1992.

The newspaper's first managing editor, Tim Hobson, said at its founding that it would be "heavy on politics as well as discussion of homeless empowerment". He also said an important goal was to "put a face on the homeless to show that we're human beings".

MIT Professor Noam Chomsky, together with his friend, the historian Howard Zinn, were some of the first major supporters of Spare Change News.

In June 1993, one of the founders, James L. Shearer, appeared before the Boston City Council to accept a special commendation on behalf of Spare Change as the newspaper celebrated its one-year anniversary.

In July 2002, Spare Change News and the Homeless Empowerment Project hosted the Seventh Annual Conference of the North American Street Newspaper Association.

In May 2004, Spare Change News hired journalist Samuel Scott, who was a Boston University graduate as well as former Boston Courant reporter and Boston Globe editorial assistant, to be its first professional editor. He changed the tone of the paper from advocacy journalism to objective reporting on social issues and revamped it from a black-and-white broadsheet into a color tabloid. He was later executive director of the Homeless Empowerment Project.

In November 2007, Boston's South End street newspaper Whats Up Magazine disbanded and merged into Spare Change News under the umbrella of the Homeless Empowerment Project. On February 28, 2008, Whats Up published their first 4-page insert inside Spare Change News.

In 2008, Spare Change News received a grant from The Harbus Foundation of Harvard University Business School, to use it "to support a long-term marketing strategy to increase the awareness of the organization amongst the general public and generate broader distribution and commensurate aid for its vendors."

In October 2010, a Worcester, Massachusetts edition of Spare Change News was launched. It is a collaboration of Spare Change News and the Worcester Homeless Action Committee.

In July 2011, the newspaper replaced Adam Sennott with Tom Benner, a former head of the Massachusetts State House bureau for The Patriot Ledger as the new editor-in-chief.

In June 2012, Vincent Flanagan, Esq., was appointed executive director of the Homeless Empowerment Project/Spare Change News.

In August 2012, the Reverend Osagyefo Uhuru Sekou, a Pentecostal (Church of God in Christ) Christian minister, community organizer, and activist who studied religion at Harvard University and Union Theological Seminary in New York, joined Spare Change News as Editor-in-Chief.

In August 2015, Ms. Katherine Bennett was hired as executive director of HEP/SCN replacing Vincent Flanagan who had been on board for several years and had moved with his family out of state. Bennett, who is from the South Shore of Greater Boston, was involved in many homeless advocacy projects and was a journalist.

== See also ==
- List of street newspapers
