= Real Change =

Newspaper in Seattle, Washington

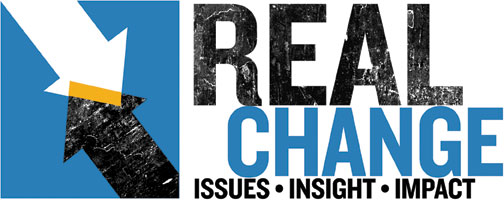
- Type: Weekly street newspaper
- Format: Compact
- Founder: Tim Harris
- Founded: 1994; 32 years ago
- Political alignment: Homeless advocacy
- Headquarters: Seattle
- Circulation: 13,000 weekly (2019)
- Price: USD $2.00
- Website: realchangenews.org

Real Change is a weekly progressive street newspaper based in Seattle, written by professional staff and sold by self-employed vendors, many of whom are homeless. The paper provides them with an alternative to panhandling and covers a variety of social justice issues, including homelessness and poverty. It became weekly in 2005, making it the second American street newspaper ever to be published weekly. Real Change is a 501(c)(3) non-profit organization with an annual budget of $950,000.

== History and Circulation ==
Real Change has been published by the Real Change Homeless Empowerment Project since 1994; the paper's founder, Tim Harris, founded the Spare Change News street newspaper in the Boston area in 1992. After moving to Seattle in 1994, he started Real Change as a monthly paper with only one staff member. Later, the paper started producing every other week.

In February 2005, Real Change began publishing weekly due to increasing interest and sales, making it the second street newspaper in the country to do so. (Note: StreetWise, a Chicago street newspaper, went weekly in 1998. (Green, Norma Fay (1998). "Chicago's StreetWise at the Crossroads: A Case Study of a Newspaper to Empower the Homeless in the 1990s". Print Culture in a Diverse America. eds. James Philip Danky, Wayne A. Wiegand. University of Illinois Press. p. 51. ISBN 978-0-252-06699-3. )) In addition to becoming a weekly newspaper, it hired several professional journalists shifting its focus to become a broadly progressive alternative paper. As a biweekly, it sold 18,000 copies every two weeks; and now has a weekly circulation of 16,000 papers. In April 2013, the paper's price increased from one dollar to two dollars and was the sixth street newspaper to do so.

In 2012, it sold 872,562 copies and raised $957,949: 68.42 percent from donations and grants; 31.26 percent from circulation, advertising and subscriptions; and 0.32 percent from other sources. As of 2017, it has a yearly circulation of 550,000 copies and sales account for 30 percent of the $1.2 million budget; beginning in 2019, vendors are able to take payment using the Venmo app.

== Contents ==
The topics covered in Real Change are a mixture of progressive local news and information specifically pertaining to the homeless and poor. Though it covers local news, it still openly advocates for "social justice" and attempts to educate readers about homelessness. Some readers, though, admit that they buy the paper more to help out and interact with the vendors than to actually read the contents; this pattern of buying is common among street newspapers. Part of the reason for the paper becoming a weekly publication in 2005 was to attract more readers and move the newspaper's image from a "charity buy" to a legitimate source of news.

== Vendors ==
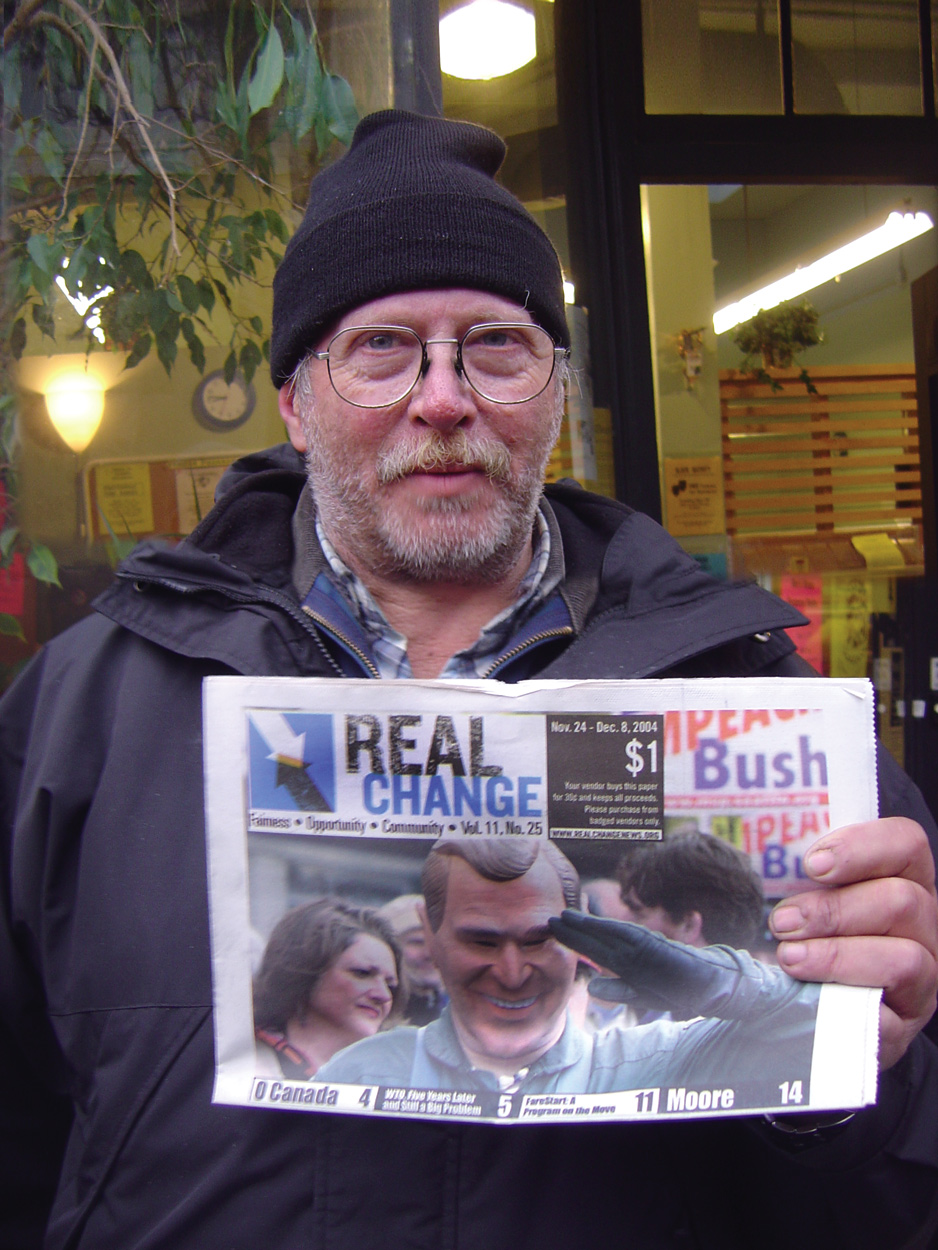
Real Change vendor (2008)

Anyone may be a Real Change vendor. However, most are poor or unable to hold a regular job due to physical disability, mental illness, criminal records, or other issues. After attending an orientation and signing a code of conduct, Vendors get their first 10 papers free. The original price of the paper was $1, starting in the late 1990s. From 2013-2026, vendors purchased the paper for sixty cents and sold it for two dollars keeping the difference. As of 2026, vendors purchase the paper for $1.25 and sell it for the cover price of $4, plus any tips. The paper has an average of 350 to 400 active vendors each month and there as many as 800 vendors in a year, if occasional vendors are included.

Most vendors sell within Seattle proper, although some sell in the Eastside, as far north as Bellingham, and as far south as Olympia, WA. Vendors may sell without restriction on sidewalks and public spaces, and sometimes need to obtain permission to sell in commercial areas like malls. Several vendors are very successful, selling as many as 2,000 papers a month and being known as "fixtures" in the community, however most sell far less than that. Real Change's "turf system" allows vendors selling over 300 papers per month to have priority at certain spots; according to Harris, this system allows buyer-vendor relationships to grow and for vendors to become well known in communities, and can minimize conflict and competition between vendors.

Not all the vendors of Real Change are homeless, several are able to afford an apartment by selling the paper and others share accommodations with others. Like Washington, D.C.'s Street Sense, Real Change does not screen incoming vendors for income or living situation, nor does it "retire" vendors after they have obtained stable housing. The paper's staff have stated, however, that the majority of vendors are living in poverty and no vendors are "living in the bling-bling" from selling papers.

== Awards ==
2004:

- Susan Hutchison Bosch Award for outstanding achievement

2006:

- First place, personalities

2008:

- Best feature writing
- First place, general news reporting
- First place, social issues
- First place, minorities
- Third place, humorous writing
- Honorable mention, personalities

2009:

- First place, educational reporting
- First place, social issues reporting
- First place, Arts reporting and criticism

2011:

- First place, education news
- First place, consumer affairs news
- Third place, social issues, religion, minority affairs
- Third place, personality profile

2012:

- First place, general news coverage
- First place, lifestyle reporting
- First place, page design
- Second place, government and politics reporting
- Second place, feature photography
- Third place, page design

2013:

- First place, general news coverage
- First place, government and politics reporting
- First place, education reporting
- First place, page design
- Second place, page design
- Second place, social issues reporting
- Second place, general excellence
- Third place, sports reporting
