= Homeless Grapevine =

Street newspaper

The masthead of the Homeless Grapevine

The Homeless Grapevine was a street newspaper sold by homeless people in Cleveland, Ohio, United States. It was published by the Northeast Ohio Coalition for the Homeless (NEOCH) from 1992 to 2009. Vendors bought the paper for 25 cents per copy and sell them for 1 dollar. The papers attempted to be a voice for the homeless and content was entirely dedicated to homeless issues, much of it written by current or former homeless. It was a monthly magazine of 16 pages and as of 2004 had a circulation of 5,000 copies sold by 15–20 vendors. Sellers were often at The West Side Market, Public Square, E. 9th St., East 12th and Coventry.

== History ==
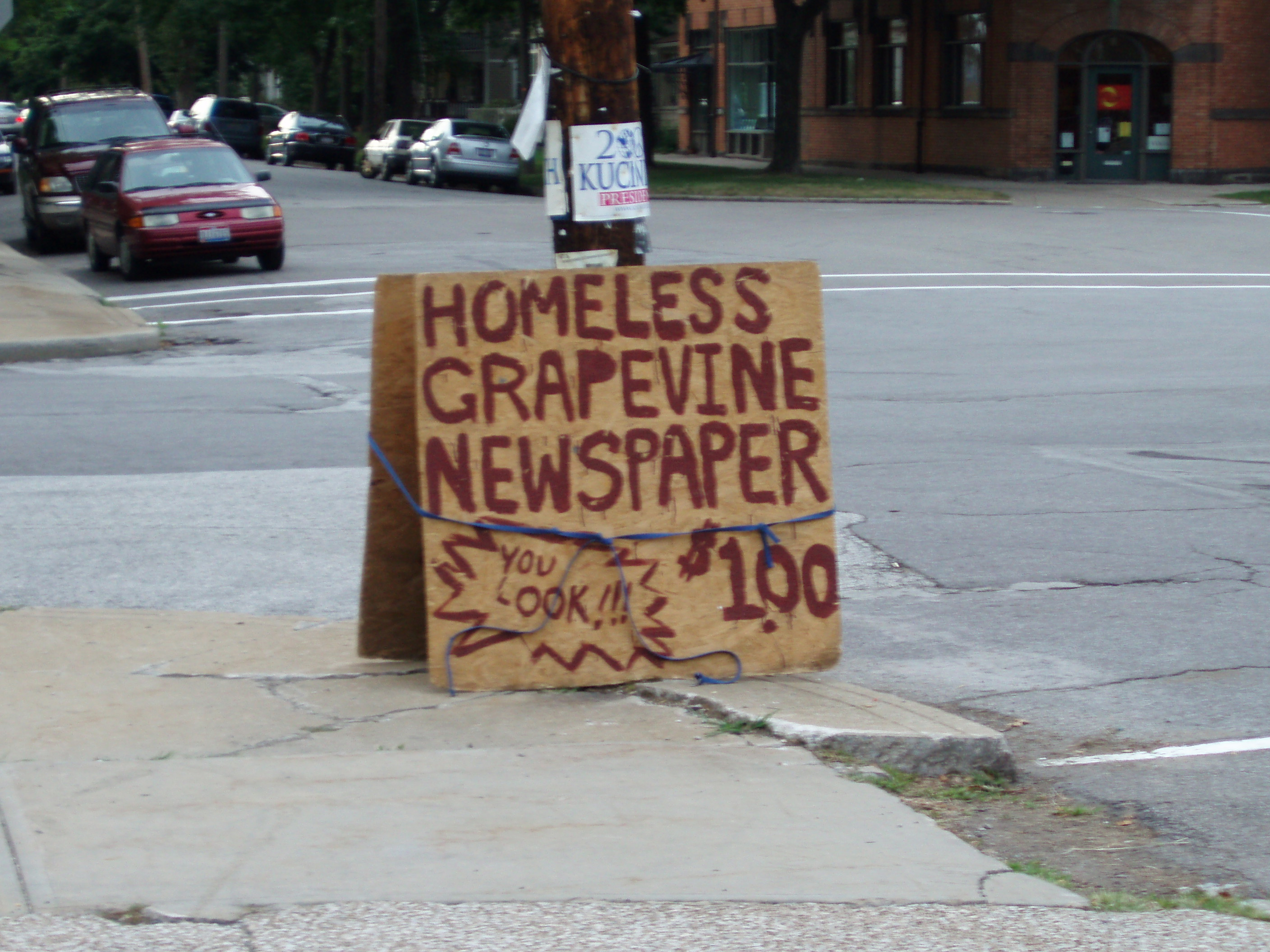
A sign advertising the Homeless Grapevine at Lincoln Park, Tremont

It was started in 1991 by Kent State University student Fred Maier and was originally photocopied and sold for 25 cents. In 1993 it was taken over NEOCH and its former director Bryan Gillooly, who published the first issue of the new Homeless Grapevine that spring.

The special issue 65(a) in May–June 2004 was entirely dedicated to Daniel Thompson, the poet laureate of Cuyahoga County, who was also a homeless advocate and had often written for the paper.

The Homeless Grapevine was listed as a "notable entry" in the 2006 Knight-Batten Awards with the comment "A pat on the back for job well done". The paper won the Greater Cleveland Community Shares Social Justice Reporting Award in 2005.

The Homeless Grapevine was discontinued in 2009. The following year, NEOCH launched its replacement, The Cleveland Street Chronicle.

=== Legal activities ===
In the mid-1990s, the city required that Grapevine sellers have a peddlers' license, costing 50 dollars. After one vendor was ticketed, the American Civil Liberties Union of Ohio argued that it was a violation of the First Amendment and the charges were dropped. A lawsuit was also filed on behalf of homeless vendors and the Nation of Islam that was selling their newspaper The Final Call in public. A district court ruled with the vendors, but the Sixth Circuit Appeals Court reversed it, siding with the city.

According to ACLU representatives, the Grapevine's coverage also played a major role in resolving another ACLU lawsuit, which had been brought against the city for transporting homeless to isolated areas.
