= Street Sense (newspaper) =

- Real People, Real Stories, Real Change
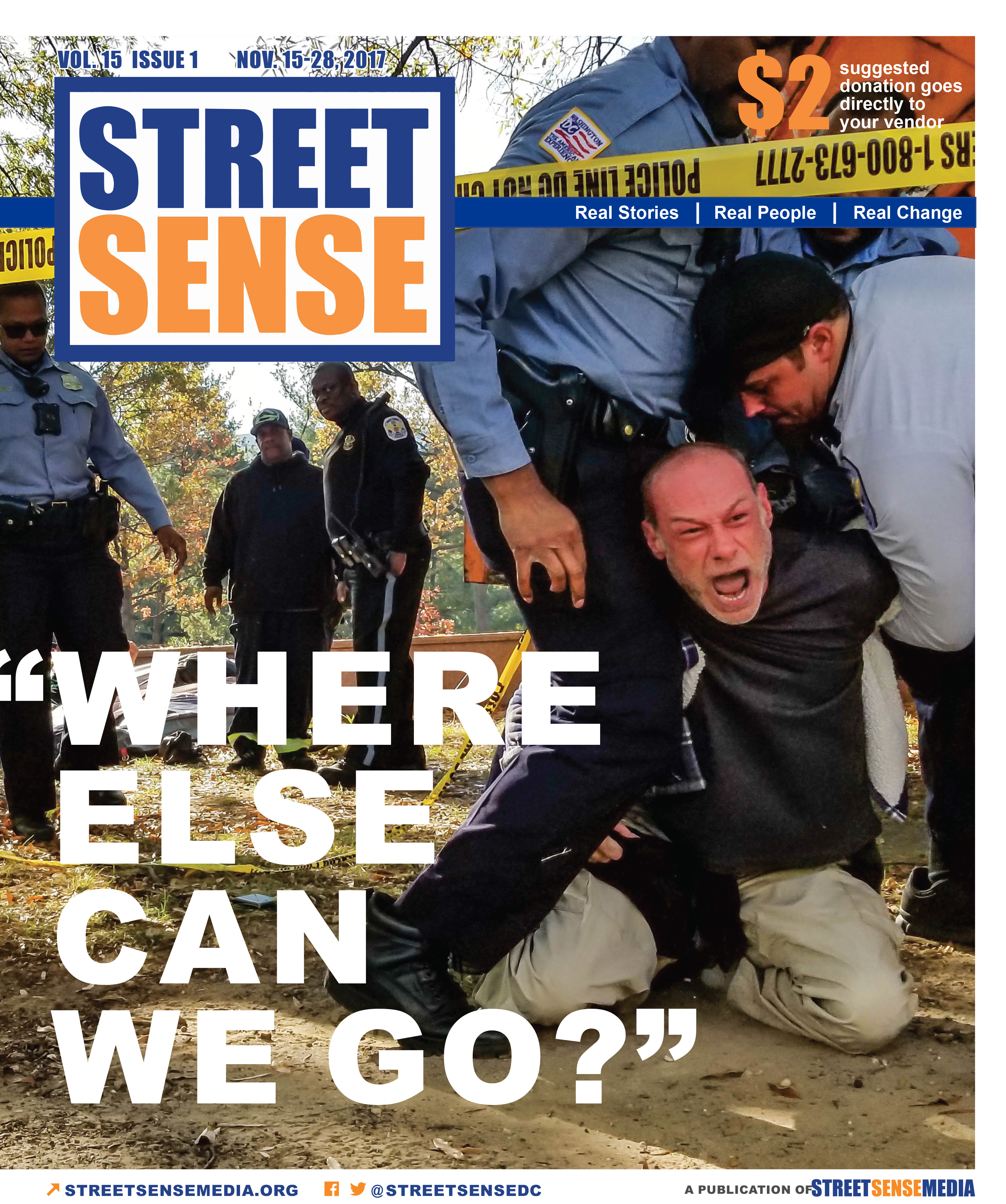
- Cover of volume 15 issue 1
- Type: Street newspaper
- Format: Compact
- Founder(s): Ted Henson, Laura Thompson Osuri
- Publisher: Street Sense Media
- Editor-in-chief: Annemarie Cuccia
- Opinion editor: Rebecca Koenig, Emily Kopp, Lydia DePillis
- Staff writers: 15-30 volunteers
- Founded: August 2003
- Political alignment: Nonpartisan
- Language: English
- City: Washington, DC
- Country: United States
- Readership: Approx. 12,000 monthly
- Sister newspapers: International Network of Street Papers
- Website: streetsensemedia.org

Street Sense is a weekly street newspaper sold by self-employed homeless distributors on the streets of Washington, D.C. It is published by the 501(c)(3) nonprofit Street Sense Media.

Street Sense Media is a member of the International Network of Street Papers and the Institute for Nonprofit News.

== Newspaper ==
The newspaper is a collaborative effort between homeless vendors, freelancers, and staff, focusing on issues of homelessness and poverty. It provides a "no-barrier" work opportunity for homeless individuals, fostering community engagement and social conversation.

As of 2017, Street Sense Media has over 130 active vendors distributing roughly 10,000 newspapers every two-week cycle.

== History ==
Street Sense was first published in November 2003.

- In June 2006, a story by one of the paper's vendors and the editor that exposed eviction companies that exploited homeless people for day labor was featured on the front page of The Wall Street Journal and led to a class-action lawsuit.
- In February 2007, the paper increased publication from once a month to twice a month.
- In January 2013, the paper increased the suggested donation amount listed on the cover of each edition to $2, and the wholesale cost to vendors, listed on the inside cover, to 50 cents per newspaper. When Street Sense was founded in 2003, the paper was sold to vendors for 25 cents per newspaper and was given to customers for a suggested donation of $1. The cost for vendors rose to 35 cents in 2009 during the Great Recession, with no adjustment of the suggested donation.
- In May 2017, the organization hired a full-time case manager to help vendors connect with resources such as housing, employment and health care. This complemented a part-time social worker who had been hired several years beforehand.
- In October 2017, a digital sales application was launched to enable credit card purchases of the paper on mobile devices.
- In March 2020, Street Sense Media temporarily suspended the printing and person-to-person distribution of Street Sense due to the COVID-19 pandemic in the United States. The organization continued to publish a digital edition of Street Sense.
- In July 2020, printing and person-to-person distribution of the publication resumed.
- In April 2021, Street Sense became one of five street papers internationally to produce weekly editions.
- In June 2021, Street Sense became hired its first staff reporter, a collaborative position shared with fellow nonprofit news outlet The DC Line and focused on local accountability stories.

== Awards ==
Year	Awarding Body	Award	Ref
2015	DC Commission on the Arts and Humanities	Mayor's Arts Awards — Humanitarian Highlight	
2017	Society of Professional Journalists	Best Photojournalism for a weekly newspaper	
2017	Society of Professional Journalists	Best Non-Breaking News for a weekly newspaper	
2017	Society of Professional Journalists	Best Series for a weekly newspaper	
2018	Society of Professional Journalists	Best Photojournalism for a weekly newspaper	
2018	International Network of Street Papers	Best Breakthrough	
2019	Society of Professional Journalists	Best Commentary and Criticism for a weekly newspaper	
2020	Society of Professional Journalists	Best Art/Photo Illustration for a weekly newspaper	
2021	Society of Professional Journalists	The Robert D.G. Lewis Watchdog Award	
2021	Society of Professional Journalists	Best Breaking News for a weekly newspaper	
2021	Society of Professional Journalists	Best Series for a weekly newspaper	
2021	Society of Professional Journalists	Best Feature for a weekly newspaper	
2021	Society of Professional Journalists	Best Investigative Reporting for a weekly newspaper	
2021	Society of Professional Journalists	Best Front Page Design for a weekly newspaper	

== See also ==
- Street News
- Media in Washington, D.C.
- List of newspapers in Washington, D.C.
- DCTV (TV station)
