= StreetWise =

Street magazine

- Type: Weekly magazine
- Editor: Suzanne Hanney
- Founded: 1992
- Headquarters: 2009 South State Street, Chicago, IL 60616; US
- Price: US$2.00
- Website: streetwise.org

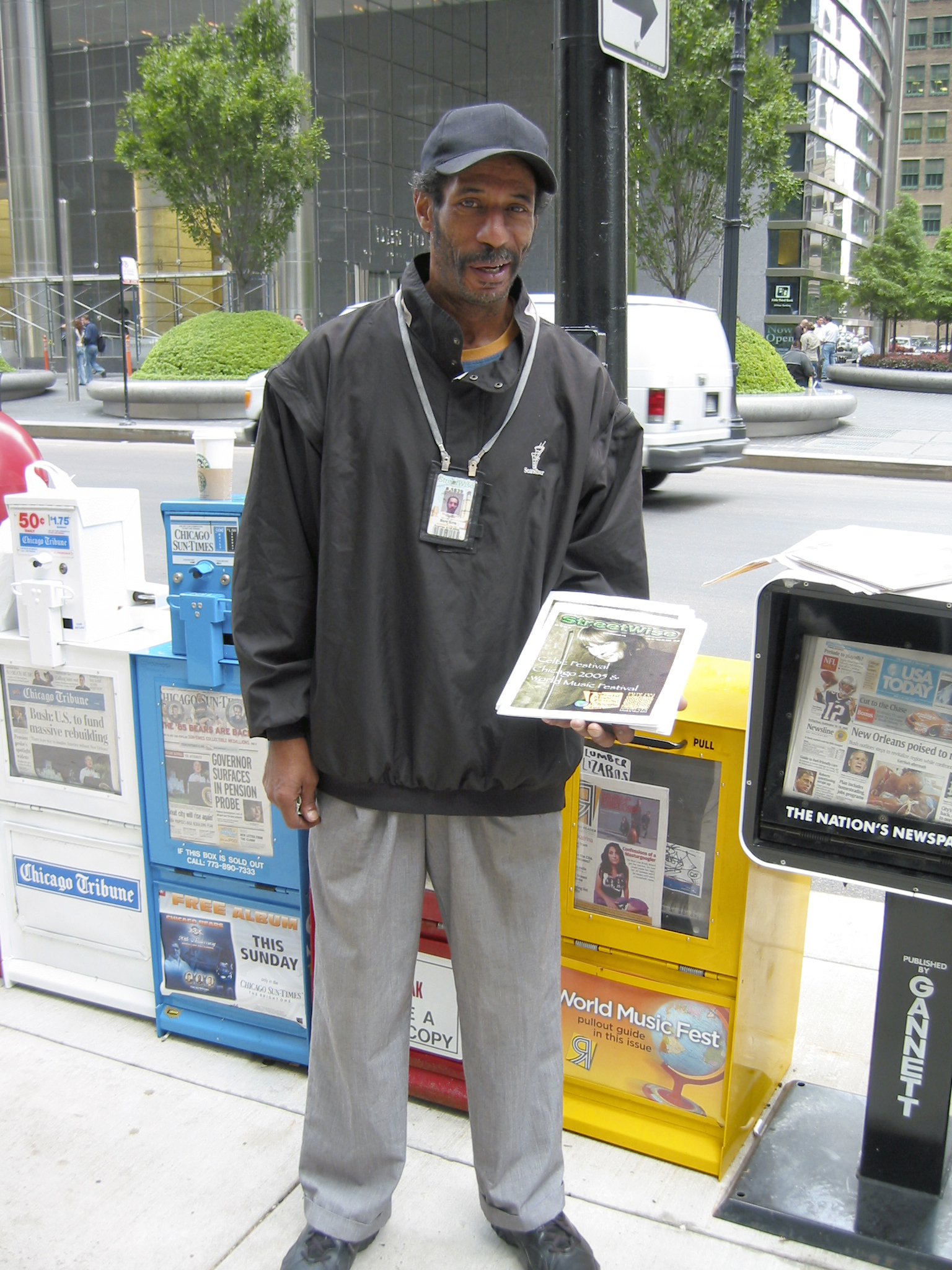
StreetWise vendor

StreetWise is a street magazine sold by people without homes or those at-risk for homelessness in Chicago. Topics covered depend on what is happening in Chicago at the time.

StreetWise contains art, poetry, and articles by vendors; as well as stories of local and national interest, particularly progressive issues.

== History ==
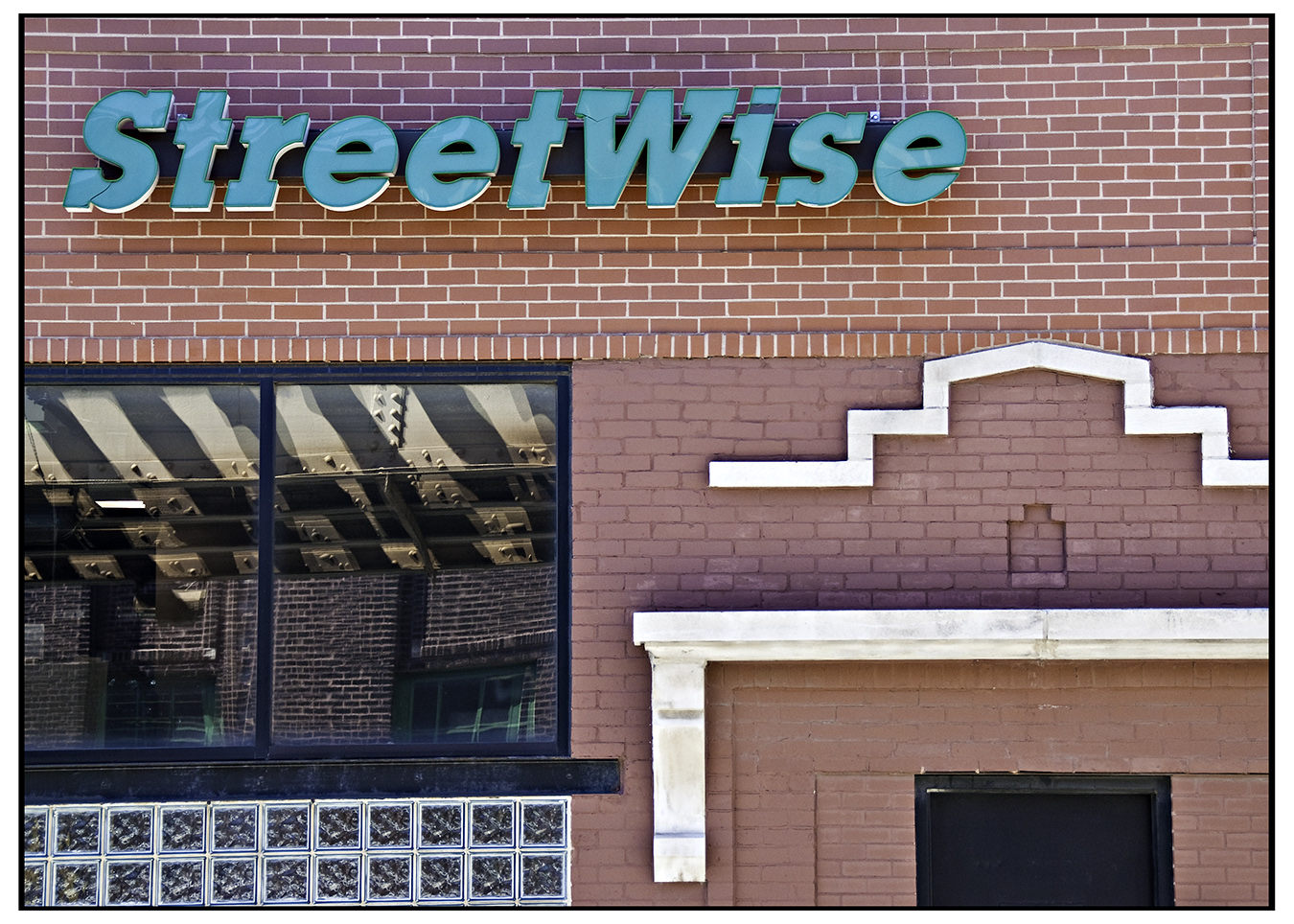
StreetWise Headquarters on Lake Street

In 1991 a group of Chicago business people joined the Chicago Coalition for the Homeless to address the growing problem of street homelessness. In 1992, Judd Lofchie created StreetWise. About 200 vendors sell approximately 20,000 magazines weekly. The vendors buy the magazine for 90 cents each and sell for $2, keeping the profit. In 2003, it had the largest readership of any street publication in the United States of America.

Over time, the magazine has fallen victim to a slow economy. Foundation support had made up nearly half of StreetWise's $500,000 budget but is down 60 percent as of 2012. Ad revenues also are in decline and street sales have dropped 20 percent.

After publishers and board members announced on April 15, 2009, that declining revenues and foundation support might force a closure with 45 days, donations began pouring in. Before the end of the day, an influx of almost $41,000 helped the ailing publication halfway to its goal. Within a week, over $190,000 in donations were made, far exceeding the needed $75,000 to keep afloat.

During a February 2009 meeting, StreetWise's board of directors decided to fire Executive Director Michael Speer and began to discuss potential replacements. Bruce Crane was promoted to turn the company around. Crane reduced operation costs and increased ad sales. The organization went from $200,000 in debt to posting a net income of $1,168 last year under Crane.

Jim LoBianco, the former Commissioner for the Office of Homeless Services in Chicago, succeeded Bruce Crane as the magazine's executive director on January 1, 2011.

In 2008, the format changed from the original tabloid-style newspaper to a magazine publication.

== See also ==
- International Network of Street Papers
- North American Street Newspaper Association
