= North American Street Newspaper Association =

Street newspaper organization

NASNA logo

The North American Street Newspaper Association (NASNA) was an organization of street newspapers that provided employment opportunities, community and a voice to homeless and other economically vulnerable people who existed between 2007 and 2013. As of October 2008 it had 28 members in the United States and Canada with a total monthly circulation of about 255,000 copies. NASNA held an annual conference and run the Street News Service (SNS) together with AlterNet to share articles.

== History ==
The seed to start NASNA was planted in August 1996 at the first North American Street Newspaper Summit in Chicago, sponsored by papers StreetWise and Real Change as well as the National Coalition for the Homeless. It was formally founded in September 1997 when 37 street newspapers met at the second conference in Seattle. In 2006 NASNA had 47 member newspapers. In early 2009, the North American Street Newspaper Association hired an executive director for the first time. In December 2013 the association was dissolved as a volunteer structure was viewed as preferable to the existing corporate structure.

== See also ==
- International Network of Street Papers
