= International Network of Street Papers =

Non-profit organization

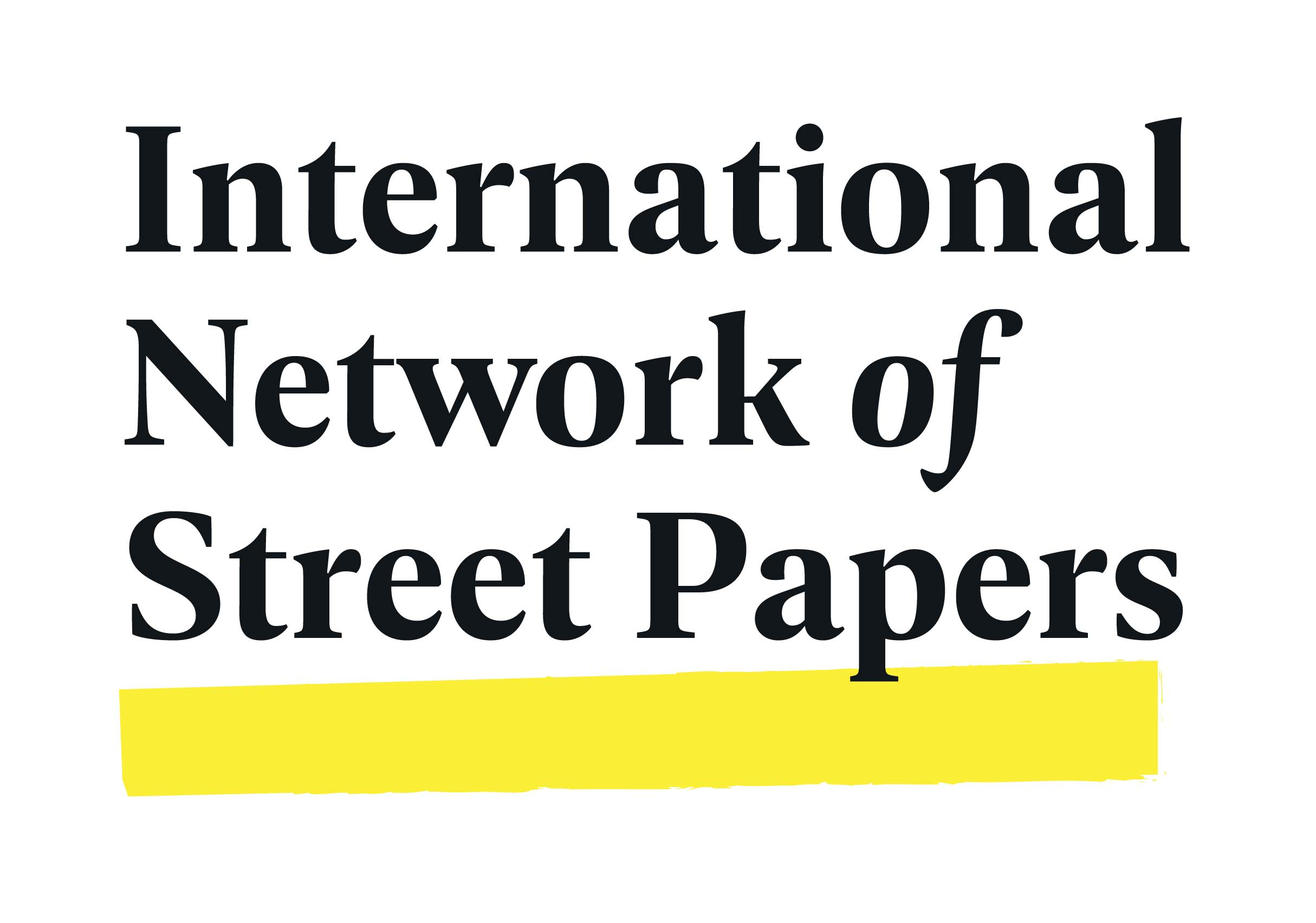
INSP logo

The International Network of Street Papers (INSP) is a non-profit membership organisation and global community dedicated to tackling poverty and homelessness. The organisation supports street papers to start up, develop and scale through events, regional networks, peer-to-peer learning opportunities and its international news agency called the News Service It also connects street papers and supporters, building a global movement to tackle poverty.

The organisation is headquartered in Glasgow, Scotland. Its membership currently consists of over 90 street papers in 35 countries.

== INSP News Service (formerly the Street News Service) ==
The INSP News Service (formerly the Street News Service) is a news agency for street papers run by the International Network of Street Papers. It carries articles, essays, news and photos from newspapers sold and sometimes written by people experiencing homelessness, poverty and other forms of marginalisation. It enables street papers worldwide to share stories with each other. INSP has formed partnerships with agencies such as Reuters, the Thomson Reuters Foundation, Inter Press Service, the Conversation, Next City and other external agencies to share additional stories and photos with INSP member street papers.

INSP itself also creates original content for the News Service. The News Service is distributed weekly in two languages to over 200 journalists.

It was originally started as a collaboration between the North American Street Newspaper Association and AlterNet.

== Sources ==
- Levinson, David; Ross, Marcy (2007). Homelessness Handbook. Berkshire Publishing Group. ISBN 978-1-933782-03-4.
