= List of Swedish-language newspapers =

The number of newspapers in Sweden was 235 in 1919. It decreased to 125 papers in the mid-1960s. In 2009 the number of the newspapers in the country was 90.

This is a list of Swedish-language newspapers with their respective cities of publication. Swedish newspaper circulation (number of copies sold) is measured by Tidningsstatistik AB.

== Major, subscription morning newspapers ==
Morning newspapers are mostly sold by subscription and delivered to homes after midnight or in the early morning. Traditionally, morning newspapers used the broadsheet format, but around the year 2000 all have changed to the smaller tabloid format.

- Dagens Nyheter (Stockholm)
- Göteborgs-Posten (Gothenburg)
- Svenska Dagbladet (Stockholm)
- Sydsvenska Dagbladet (Malmö and Lund)

=== Historic titles ===
- Aftontidningen
- Arbetet (Malmö), published 1887–2000
- Dagsposten (Stockholm), published 1941–1951
- Folkviljan (Malmö), published between 1882 and 1885
- Folkbladet, weekly newspaper published between 1894 and 1907
- Göteborgs Handels- och Sjöfartstidning (GHT) (Gothenburg), published 1832–1973
- Nationen, published 1925–1941
- Nya Folkviljan, socialist weekly newspaper published in southern Sweden 1906–1920
- Ny Illustrerad Tidning, illustrated weekly newspaper published in Stockholm between 1865 and 1900
- Post- och Inrikes Tidningar, Sweden's official gazette, published 1645–2000, now only a web journal
- Skånes köpmannablad, weekly business newspaper published 1919–1935
- Stockholms-Tidningen, published 1889–1966 and 1981–1984
- Vägen Framåt, nationalist weekly newspaper published 1932–1992

== Evening newspapers ==
Evening newspapers are sold in stores only, not by subscription, starting around 10 a.m. daily. They are in the tabloid format. Their history dates back to Aftonbladet, founded in 1830.

- Aftonbladet (Stockholm)
- Expressen (Stockholm), founded in 1944, with local editions carrying the names of earlier independent newspapers:
  - GT (Gothenburg), founded in 1902, acquired by Expressen in 1998
  - Kvällsposten (Malmö), founded in 1948, acquired by Expressen in 1998

== Free newspapers ==
Free newspapers, entirely financed by advertisements, were an innovation of the 1990s. They have successfully been distributed in local public transport, such as the Stockholm subway. They always use the tabloid format.

- Metro, free, printed in four editions: Stockholm, Gothenburg, Skåne and National (Riks), which was distributed in 67 towns and cities throughout the country. Cancelled in August 2019.
- Stockholm City, free, distributed in Stockholm, defunct since June 2011

== Nationwide special topic newspapers ==
These are distributed as morning newspapers.

- Dagen, Christian newspaper, founded in 1945 by Pentecostal preacher Lewi Pethrus
- Dagens Industri (Di), daily business newspaper printed on pink paper in tabloid format
- Proletären, the weekly newspaper of the Communist Party since the 1970s.

== Local and regional newspapers ==
- Arbetarbladet (Gävle)
- Barometern (Kalmar)
- Bohusläningen (Uddevalla)
- Blekinge Läns Tidning (Karlskrona)
- Borås Tidning (Borås)
- Dagbladet (Sundsvall)
- Dala-Demokraten (Falun)
- Dik Manusch (Västerbotten)
- Enköpings-Posten (Enköping)
- Eskilstuna-Kuriren (Eskilstuna)
- Fagersta-Posten (Fagersta, Norberg)
- Falu Kuriren (Falun)
- Folkbladet (Norrköping)
- Folket (Eskilstuna)
- Gefle Dagblad (Gävle)
- Gotlands Allehanda (Visby)
- Gotlands Tidningar (Visby)
- Hallands Nyheter (Falkenberg)
- Hallandsposten (Halmstad)
- Haparandabladet (Haparanda)
- Helsingborgs Dagblad (Helsingborg)
- Hudiksvalls Tidning (Hudiksvall)
- Jönköpings-Posten (Jönköping)
- Karlstads-Tidningen (Karlstad)
- Katrineholms-Kuriren (Katrineholm)
- Kristianstadsbladet (Kristianstad)
- Länstidningen (Östersund)
- Länstidningen (Södertälje)
- Nerikes Allehanda (Örebro)
- Norra Skåne (Hässleholm)
- Norra Västerbotten (Skellefteå)
- Norrbottens-Kuriren (Luleå)
- Norrköpings Tidningar (Norrköping)
- Norrländska Socialdemokraten (Luleå)
- Nya Wermlands-Tidningen (Karlstad)
- Oskarshamnstidningen (Kalmar, Oskarshamn)
- Östergötlands Arbetartidning (1945–57)
- Skaraborgs Allehanda (Skövde)
- Skånska Dagbladet (Scania)
- Smålandsposten (Växjö)
- Smålänningen (Ljungby)
- Strengnäs Tidning (Strängnäs – local edition of Eskilstuna-Kuriren)
- Sundsvalls Tidning (Sundsvall)
- Sydsvenska Dagbladet (Scania)
- Södermanlands Nyheter (Gnesta, Nyköping, Oxelösund, Trosa)
- Tidningen Ångermanland (Härnösand, Kramfors, Sollefteå)
- Trelleborgs Allehanda (Trelleborg)
- TTELA (Trollhättan, Vänersborg, Lilla Edet, Mellerud)
- Upsala Nya Tidning (Uppsala)
- Upplands-Folket (Uppsala) (defunct)
- Vestmanlands Läns Tidning (Västerås)
- Vetlanda-Posten (Vetlanda)
- Värmlands Folkblad (Karlstad)
- Västerbottens Folkblad (Västerbotten)
- Västerbottenskuriren (Umeå)
- Västernorrlands Allehanda
- Västerviks-Tidningen (Västervik)
- Örnsköldsviks Allehanda (Örnsköldsvik)
- Östersunds-Posten (Östersund)
- Östgöta Correspondenten (Linköping)
- Östra Småland (Kalmar)

== Swedish-language newspapers in Finland ==
- Ålandstidningen (Mariehamn)
- Borgåbladet (Borgå)
- Hufvudstadsbladet (Helsingfors/Helsinki)
- Nya Åland (Mariehamn)
- Österbottens Tidning (Jakobstad)
- Östra Nyland (Loviisa)
- Saima (Kuopio)
- Syd-Österbotten (Närpes)
- Vasabladet (Vasa)
- Västra Nyland (Ekenäs)
- Åbo Underrättelser (Turku)

== Swedish-language newspapers in the United States ==
- California Veckoblad (Los Angeles)
- Hemlandet (Galesburg, 1855–1970)
- Minneapolis Veckoblad (Minneapolis, 1884–1906)
- Norden (Brooklyn)
- Nordstjernan (New York City)
- Svenska Amerikanska Posten (Minneapolis)
- Svenska Amerikanaren Tribunen (Chicago, 1936–1985)
- Vestkusten/New Vestkusten (San Francisco, 1887–2007)

== See also ==
- Blandaren
- List of magazines in Sweden
- List of Swedish television channels
- List of Finnish newspapers
- List of socialist newspapers in Sweden
- List of All Media in Sweden
