= Homelessness in Sweden =

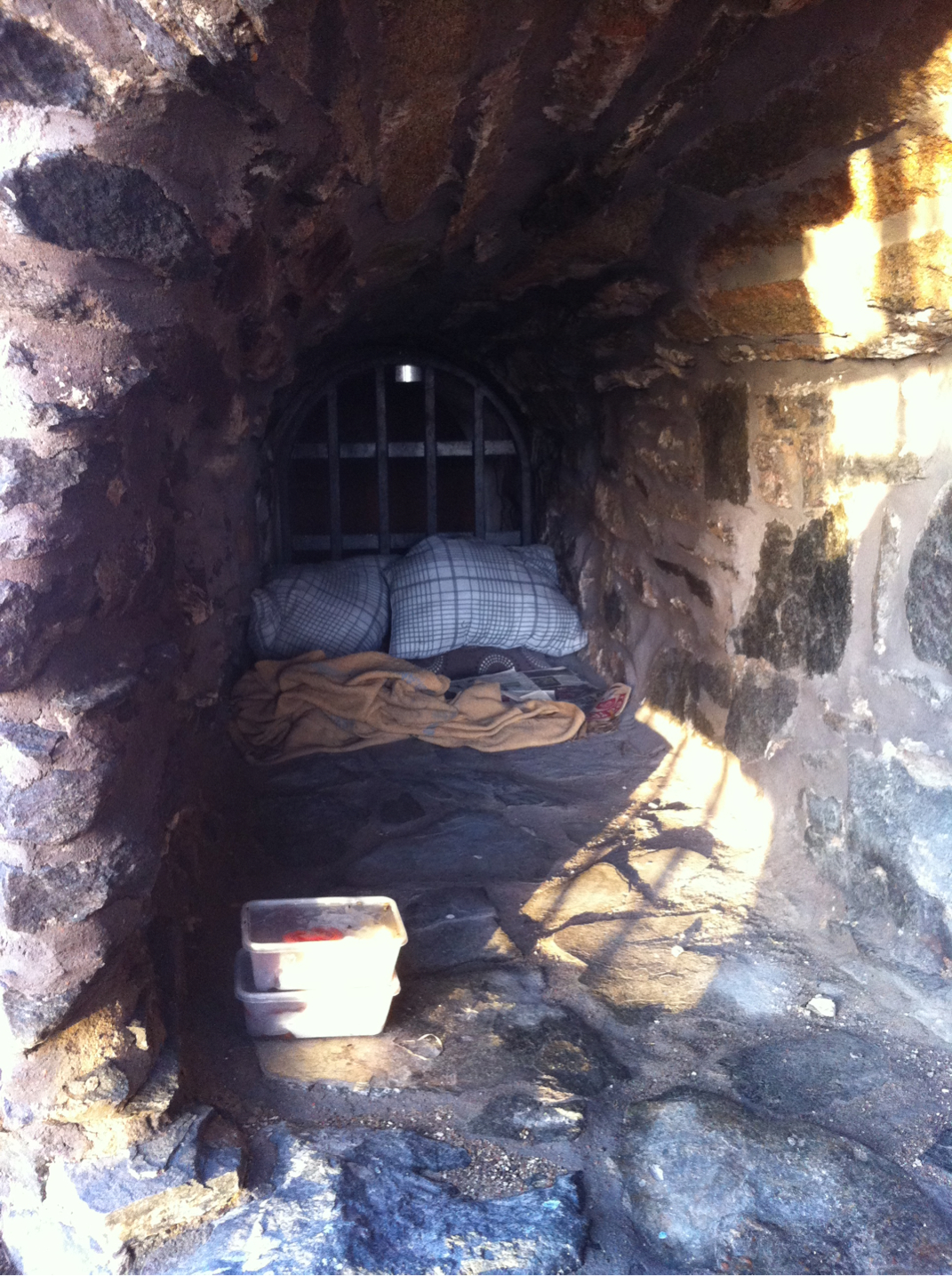
A homeless person's bed in Gothenburg, Sweden, 2013.

Homelessness in Sweden affects around 27,000 people.

The Swedish government's response to homelessness has included commissioning national surveys on homelessness during the last decade that allow for direct comparison between Sweden, Denmark and Norway. The three countries have very similar definitions of homelessness, with minor variations.

Some researchers maintain that measures to counteract homelessness in Sweden are largely dependent on a general premise equating homelessness with addiction, mental illness and deviance. On the other hand, youth homelessness is considered a child protection problem.

== Surveys ==
The National Board of Health and Welfare (Swedish: Socialstyrelsen) has released a survey of homelessness every six years since 2011. They cover 4 groups of homeless people in Sweden:

1. Acute homelessness
  Lives in emergency housing, hostel, protected shelter or similar. Also includes living outside, in garages/stairwells/cellars/public places/attics/tents/cars or similar.
2. Institution or assisted living, to leave within 3 months
  People that are currently in housing for people with disabilities, compulsory care, youth care, foster care or imprisoned, but who has to leave within 3 months without any housing solution prepared.
3. Long-term living arrangements organised by the Social Services
  Housing solutions with a contract for housing combined with supervision, special rules and limited house ownership rights (Swedish: besittningsrätt).
4. Private short-term living arrangement
  Lives non-voluntarily, temporary and without a contract among friends or acquaintances and with family or relatives.

Survey results
Year	Group				Total	Notes	Reference
Year	1	2	3	4	Total	Notes	Reference
2011	4500	5600	13900	6800	30800	Numbers are approximate.	
2017	5935	4899	15838	5726	32398	The total would be 30090 with 2023's methodology.	
2023	4436	2713	16878	3209	27383	The reported total is 147 more than the sum of the groups.	

== Street newspapers ==
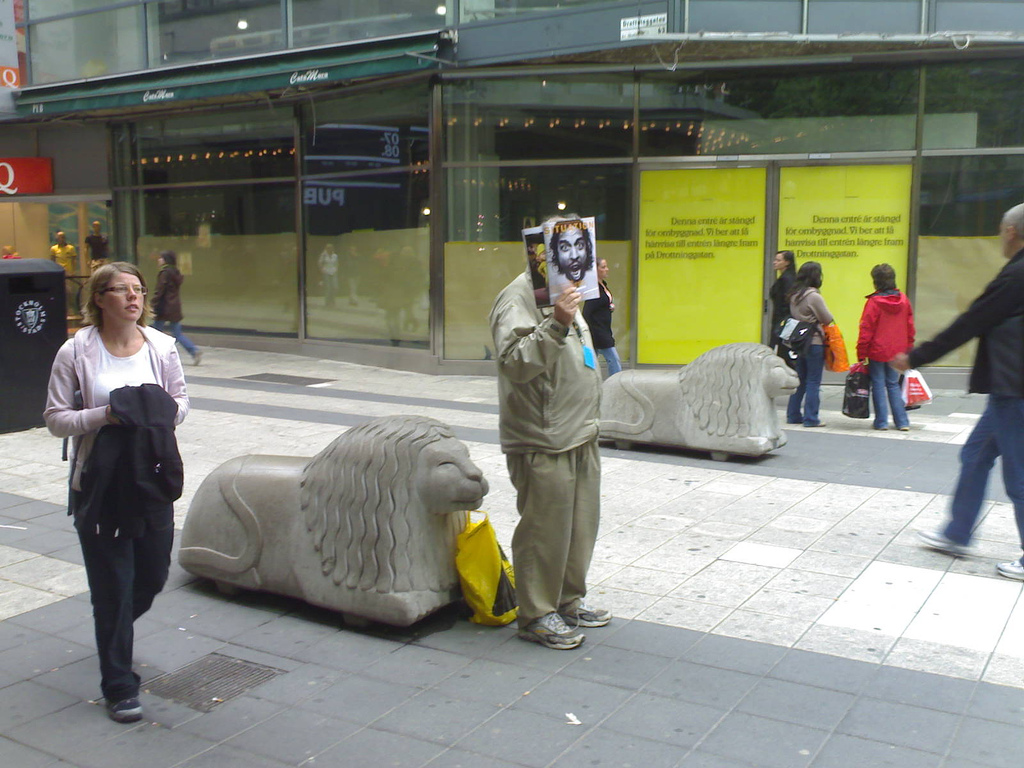
Street newspaper vendor in Stockholm

There are several street newspapers in Sweden. Situation Sthlm, was founded in 1995 and was Sweden's only street newspaper until Faktum and Aluma were founded early in the 2000s.

In 2006 the three street newspapers were awarded the grand prize of the Swedish Publicists' Association (Publicistklubben).

In 2013, a Swedish tech company created software for the homeless newspaper vendors to accept credit card payments via a mobile app.

== In art ==
In 2015, a Swedish art exhibition at Malmö Konsthall titled “The Alien Within: A Living Laboratory of Western Society” included two homeless people from Romania. The homeless people were not accepting money from visitors but were paid at hourly rate by the event organizers.

== Health ==
Researchers have found that excess mortality among homeless men and women in Stockholm is entirely related to alcohol and drug abuse.

Some researchers have conducted studies on the oral health of homeless people in Sweden and found that they have fewer remaining teeth than the general population.
