= TT News Agency =

News Agency

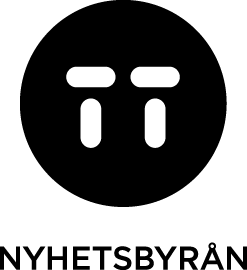
- Logo since 2013
- Type: News agency
- Founded: 1921
- Headquarters: Stockholm, Sweden
- Number of employees: 120 (2007)
- Website: tt.se

TT News Agency (Swedish: TT Nyhetsbyrån or simply TT; formerly Tidningarnas Telegrambyrå until 2013, translates to The newspapers' telegram bureau) is a Swedish news agency, the largest in Scandinavia, owned jointly by the country's newspapers and the media groups behind them. TT's services are used as the exclusive source of national news by many local media outlets.

TT News Agency is the national wire service in Sweden with a history dating back to the 1920s. TT News Agency provides news articles, images, video and infographics to Sweden's media outlets, companies and public authorities.

TT News Agency is ranked as one of Europe's most profitable news agencies. The number of employees is, as of 2018, 208 people. TT News Agency is privately owned by the largest Swedish media houses and stands free from any government, religious or political spheres. CEO and Editor in chief is Per-Anders Broberg.

TT represent the photographer Lennart Nilsson.

TT has won several awards such as Stora Journalistpriset, Årets Bild among others.

== Ownership ==
Owner	Share
Aftonbladet	20 %
Svenska Dagbladet	10 %
Stampen Group	10 %
Expressen	10 %
Dagens Nyheter	10 %
Sydsvenska Dagbladet	10 %
NT Media	10 %
VLT AB	5 %
Upsala Nya Tidning	5 %
Pres(s)gruppen	5 %
MittMedia Förvaltnings AB	5 %

== See also ==
- TT language, style guide
