= Piteå-Tidningen =

Newspaper in Piteå, Sweden

- Founded: 1915
- Language: Swedish
- City: Piteå
- Country: Sweden
- Website: pt.se

Piteå-Tidningen (or PT) is a regional newspaper published in the Piteå area of Norrbotten County, Sweden. It was founded in 1915.

Piteå-Tidningen AB is owned by the labor movement in the Pite River valley, local unions and individuals. The paper has a social democratic editorial policy. One of its contributors was Curt Boström who began to work at the paper in 1946. Its chairman is Lars V. Granberg, and its CEO and editor is Matti Lilja.

Its central editorial office is in Piteå, with a local editorial office in Älvsbyn. Along with Norra Västerbotten newspaper it is co-owner of the news agency Nyheter i Norr ("News in the North"), which also monitors the municipalities of Arvidsjaur and Arjeplog.

The newspaper has a print run of 16,900 copies (2007). For the visually impaired, it also has a talking newspaper edition. It is the largest newspaper in the Pite River valley in competition with the liberal Norra Västerbotten and county newspapers Norrländska Socialdemokraten and Norrbottens-Kuriren.

Piteå-Tidningen is also a partner in Norrbottens Media AB, which owns Norrländska Socialdemokraten and Norrbottens-Kuriren.
