= Claes Hemberg =

Swedish economist and author (born 1968)

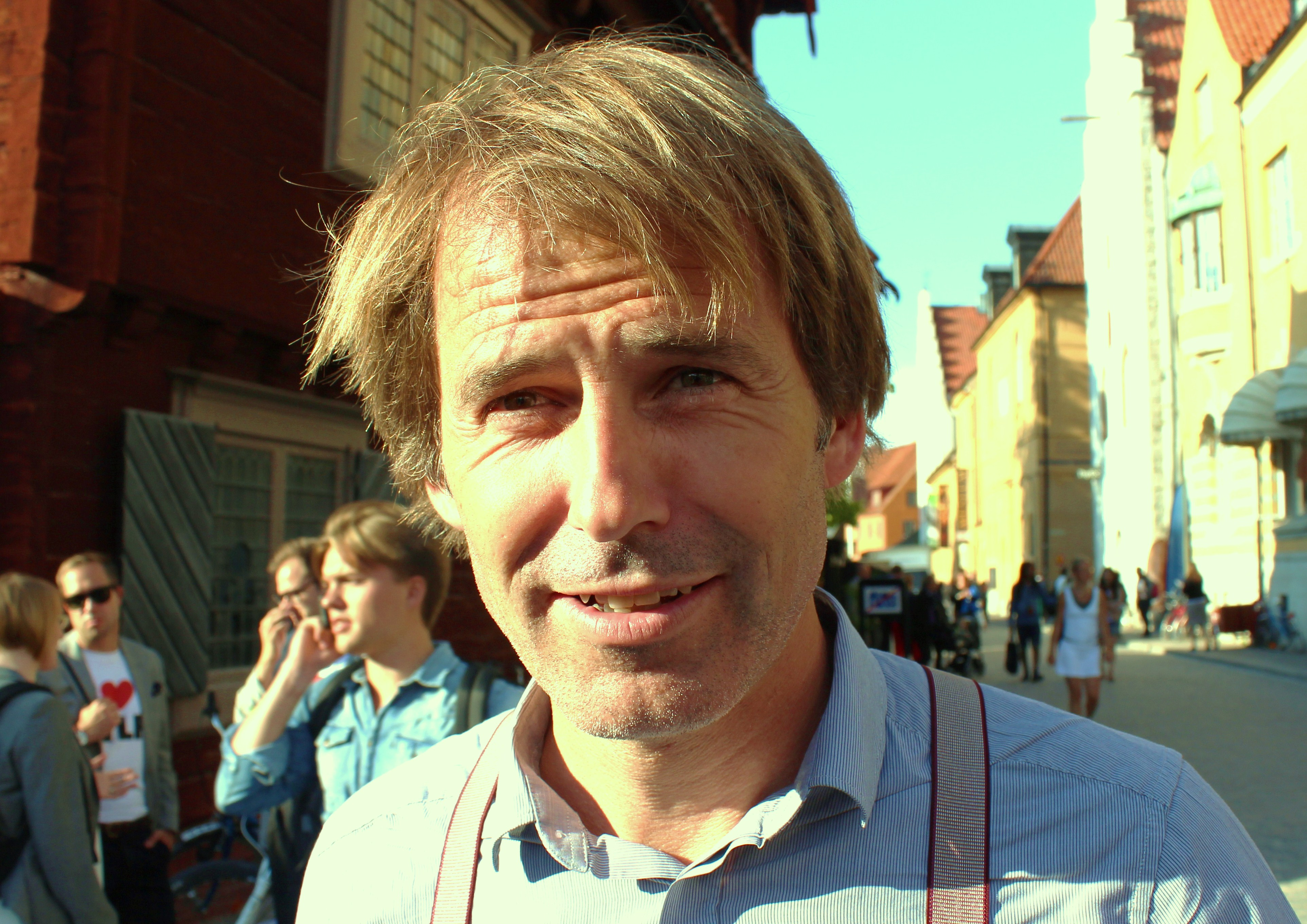
- Hemberg in 2013
- Born: Claes Gusten Persson; 9 May 1968 (age 57); Alingsås, Sweden
- Occupations: Economist; author
- Website: claeshemberg.se

Claes Gusten Hemberg (born Claes Gusten Persson; 9 May 1968) is a Swedish economist and author. He worked as a journalist before joining Avanza in 1998. Hemberg stepped down as economist of Avanza in February 2018. To work with energy and economic issues. Since August 2025, Hemberg has been active as an energy economist at Nibe Industrier.

== Biography ==
He began his education as a journalist in the early 1990s. In 1993, Hemberg had a temporary position at Strömstads Tidning. He later worked as a journalist at Norrköpings Tidningar, Södermanlands Nyheter and Aftonbladet, and as a freelancer for several magazines.

In addition to his role as an economist at Avanza Bank, Hemberg has spoken out about investing through his blog, in social media and in public debates. Hemberg led the Globen-based Avanza Forum between 2002 and 2016, which according to Avanza was Sweden's largest forum for economy and savings.

Hemberg has worked for the Financial Supervisory Authority, several unions and the Gilla din ekonomi network. He has made appearances in government-produced films about private economy, pensions and Bitcoin. In 2015, Hemberg appeared on the Låna för livet! television series and acted as a coach in an economic experiment. In 2016, Hemberg played a key role in the exhibition of Pengalabbet, held at Kungliga Myntet in Stockholm. A year later, Pengalabbet was released as an app.

In 2012, the magazine Privata Affärer awarded him the prize Årets väckarklocka, for initiating a Twitter campaign with the use of the hashtag #sägdinränta. Hemberg was ranked as one of the best super communicators in Sweden by the Resumé magazine in 2013, 2015 and 2016. Both in 2016 and 2017, he was ranked as the best personal finance commentator by Hallvarsson & Halvarsson. In 2017, Hemberg received the prize Årets upprop for getting 35,000 people involved in an appealing against higher savings tax, through the hashtag #rörintemittISK on social media.

Hemberg's assignments include work in the software company Aptic and the Lärargalan and AllBright foundations. He was previously assigned to Smarta samtal and Design Lab S. Ahead of the 2004 European Parliament election, Hemberg served as a board member for the eurosceptic political party June List, who gained 14% of the votes.

== Bibliography ==
- Hemberg, Claes (2009). Spara mindre - får ut mer: tre steg som får dina sparpengar att växa. Stockholm: Santérus Förlag. ISBN 978-91-7359-035-8.
- Hemberg, Claes (2011). Spara klokare 55+. Stockholm: Santérus Förlag. ISBN 978-91-7359-045-7.
- Hemberg, Claes (2012). Spara med barnen: från veckopeng till egen lägenhet. Stockholm: Santérus Förlag. ISBN 978-91-7359-051-8.
- Hemberg, Claes (2013). Vad är pengar och 100 andra jätteviktiga frågor. Bokförlaget Langenskiöld. ISBN 978-91-87007-22-4.
