= Dik Manusch =

Dik Manusch - DIKKO
- Type: Street newspaper - online newspaper
- Editor: Britt-Inger Hedström Lundqvist, Linda Lundqvist
- Founded: 2015
- Ceased publication: 2017 started again as an online newspaper in 2018
- Language: Swedish

Dik Manusch - DIKKO (Romani: See the Person, Se människan - titta se translated to Swedish) was a street newspaper published in northern Sweden. First published in early 2015 and focused on the Västerbotten province, the newspaper aimed to help homeless European Union migrants – who are primarily Romani people from the Balkans, especially Romania – to support themselves by providing an alternative to begging on the streets. Distributed for free to the migrants, each newspaper was sold for 50 Swedish krona, the profits going entirely to the seller. A second purpose was to create a debate in Swedish society about the conditions faced by these people.

Preparations for the newspaper began in 2014, on suggestion from Ilile Dumitru, who had seen Situation Sthlm being sold by the homeless of Stockholm. The newspaper was created by the association SAMS, a coalition of several different organizations and churches in Skellefteå. The first issue – numbering 5,000 – was printed by Norran, and featured content created by various writers on a non-profit basis. It was distributed in Skellefteå. The second issue, with 15,000 prints, was likewise printed by Norran and financed by volunteer donations. To support the newspaper an association called the Dik Manusch Vänner (Friends of Dik Manusch in English) was formed.

In the beginning of 2017, the editorial staff came to the conclusion that they no longer got enough content sent in to be able to publish an issue. A few months later it was decided to disband the association and to cease publishing the newspaper.

== Magazine DIKKO ==
In November 2018, former Dik Manusch editor Britt-Inger Hedström Lundqvist started the online newspaper DIKKO which claims to be a successor publication to Dik Manusch.

DIKKO comes from the fact that Sweden lacked a magazine that focused on Romani people. A magazine where it was possible to share individual articles that could be included in the debate and spread information.

== Publisher DIKKO ==
In 2022, the DIKKO-family was expanded with the publishing house DIKKO. The publisher's goal is to help people who want to publish literature that the big publishers don't publish. They also take the initiative to create and publish books that they believe have an educational value for the public.

The publisher wants to encourage writing. The goal is to help people who want to publish literature with a story that otherwise, perhaps, would not benefit readers. The publisher will also take the initiative to create and publish books that we believe have educational value for the public and work to revitalize the Romani language. DIKKO is located in Skellefteå, Västerbotten, and the editorial staff is located around the country. Publisher DIKKO is completely independent from the magazine.

== Awards and honors ==
At the Roma gala, "Heaven, Earth, Wheel", which was held in Malmö town hall on Friday 27 September 2019, magazine DIKKO received the award as "Audience's favourite": Magazine DIKKO received the most nominations and responsible publisher Britt-Inger Hedström Lundqvist received the Katarina Taikon prize.

In 2024, DIKKO received Ordfront's Democracy Award with the justification: A minority perspective is needed in news reporting and an anti-racist voice that advocates for the marginalized. The prize is awarded in connection with the Human Rights Days being organized in November in Skellefteå - incidentally, the city where DIKKO is based.

DIKKO was nominated for the newly established Rights Award which was awarded by the Västerbotten County Administrative Board in October 2025. The two winners were The Rights Are Ours and Sáminuorra.

In 2025, the book Queera Roma and Travelers – Stories from Norway, Sweden and Finland, Arman Heljic & Solvor Mjøberg Lauritzen (eds.) published by Förlag DIKKO, won the Prisma Literature Prize.

== See also ==
- Aluma
- Begging
- Faktum
