= List of socialist newspapers in Sweden =

The following is a list of Socialist newspapers in Sweden.

- Arbetet (Malmö), published between 1887 and 2000
- Arbetaren - SAC:s weekly newspaper Link
- Direkt Aktion - The official newspaper of the Swedish Anarcho-syndicalist Youth Federation Link
- Avanti! - A newspaper published by the Swedish section of the International Marxist Tendency Link
- Dissident - Published by a group of Communist thinkers, Batkogruppen Link
- Flamman - Close to the Swedish political party Vänsterpartiet Link
- Fronesis - Postmodern socialist magazine Link
- Internationalen - Weekly newspaper published by the Swedish Socialistiska Partiet Link
- Offensiv - Weekly newspaper published by the Swedish Trotskyist party Rättvisepartiet Socialisterna Link
- Proletären - Weekly newspaper published by the Swedish Communist Party Link
- Riff-Raff - Independent magazine Link
- Röd Press - Published by Ung Vänster Link
- Socialisten - Published by marxist social democrats/trotskyists Link
- Yelah.net - Libertarian socialist online newspaper Link
