= Borlänge Tidning =

Daily newspaper in Dalarna, Sweden

- Type: Daily newspaper
- Format: Tabloid
- Owner(s): Dalarnas Tidningar (DT) AB
- Editor: Ewa Wirén
- Founded: 1885
- Political alignment: Independently liberal
- Language: Swedish
- Headquarters: Borganäsvägen 30, Borlänge
- Website: www.borlangetidning.com

Borlänge Tidning (BT) is a daily newspaper based in Dalarna, Sweden.

== History and profile ==
BT was founded by Axel Lidman in 1885. The paper is sold and delivered to readers in Borlänge, Hedemora and Säter. It is a local edition of Dalarnas Tidningar, Sweden's second largest provincial newspaper. BT has never had a specific political affiliation, but since becoming a part of Dalarnas Tidningar, it shares editorial pages with liberal Falu-Kuriren. All papers are part of Dalarnas Tidningar AB which is a subsidiary of MittMedia AB.

In 2005 BT had a circulation of 15,600 copies.

== See also ==
- List of Swedish newspapers
