= Charles, Duke of Södermanland =

Charles, Duke of Södermanland may refer to:

- Duke Charles, then king Charles IX of Sweden
- Charles Philip, Duke of Södermanland, brother of Gustav II Adolf
- Duke Charles, then king Charles XIII of Sweden
- Duke Charles Oscar, son of Charles XV of Sweden
