= Carl of Sudermania =

Carl of Sudermania - English also often: Charles; Swedish Karl av Södermanland - as a ducal title may refer to:

- Charles IX of Sweden, King of Sweden 1604–1611
- Charles XIII of Sweden, King of Sweden 1809–1818 (and of Norway as Carl II)
- Charles Philip, Duke of Södermanland, Prince of Sweden 1601
- Prince Carl Oscar, Duke of Södermanland, Prince of Sweden and Norway 1852
