= Norrbottens-Kuriren =

- Type: Daily newspaper
- Format: Berliner format
- Owner: Norrköping Tidningar AB (NTM Group)
- Editor-in-chief: Mats Ehnbom
- Founded: 1861; 165 years ago
- Political alignment: Moderate Party
- Language: Swedish
- Headquarters: Luleå, Sweden
- Circulation: 7,000 (2024)
- Sister newspapers: Norrköpings Tidningar; Folkbladet
- ISSN: 1103-9760
- Website: www.kuriren.nu

Norrbottens-Kuriren (simply NK) is a daily regional conservative newspaper published in Norrbotten County, Sweden, and has its main office in Luleå.

== History and profile ==
Norrbottens-Kuriren was founded in 1861, and therefore is the oldest newspaper in the region. The paper was acquired by Norrköping Tidningar AB (NTM Group) in 2000. The company also owns Norrköpings Tidningar and Folkbladet among the others.

Norrbottens-Kuriren is published in Berliner format. One of the paper's staff journalists were convicted of involvement in the political assassination attempt in 1940 against the rival left-wing newspaper Norrskensflamman, in which five people died. In the surrounding area, Norrbottens-Kuriren has one main competitor, named Norrländska Socialdemokraten (NSD). The managing director is Sture Bergman.

In 1996 the circulation of Norrbottens-Kuriren was 30,700 copies. In 2005, the paper had 27,600 readers. The paper had a circulation of 19,600 copies in 2010.

== See also ==
- List of Swedish newspapers
