= Åke Strömmer =

Swedish television host (1936–2005)

- Born: Åke Per-Erik Strömmer; 10 June 1936; Härnösand, Sweden
- Died: 22 February 2005 (aged 68); Borlänge, Sweden
- Occupation: Sports journalist
- Spouse: Lena Ingels (m. 1981)
- Children: 5

Åke Per-Erik Strömmer (10 June 1936 – 22 February 2005) was a Swedish sports journalist, radio presenter and television host.

== Early life ==
Strömmer was born on 10 June 1936 in Härnösand, Sweden, the son of Erik Strömmer, an accountant, and his wife May (née Bolin). He passed studentexamen in 1956.

== Career ==
Strömmer was employed at Västernorrlands Allehanda from 1957 to 1958 before joining Sveriges Radio the same year. He worked for Sveriges Radio in Luleå from 1959 to 1962 and in Malmö from 1962 to 1963. Strömmer worked for Radiosporten, the sport section of Sveriges Radio in Stockholm from 1963 to 1978, where he served as the head from 1974 to 1978. He was the district manager for Sveriges Radio Falun from 1979 to 1984 and the manager of Borlänge Folkets Hus from 1984 to 1986, as well as for Sveriges Radio Falun from 1987 to 1996. Strömmer worked as a freelancer from 1996 onwards.

== Personal life ==
In 1981, Strömmer married Lena Ingels (born 1937), the daughter of John Jansson and Carin (née Johansson).

== Death ==
Åke Strömmer died on 22 February 2005 after suffering from cancer. He was interred on 16 May 2005 at Stora Tuna Cemetery near Borlänge.
