= Dalarnas Tidningar =

Swedish media company

Dalarnas Tidningar (DT) is a Swedish media company formed in 1987 through the merger of Falu-Kuriren AB and Dalarnes Tidnings & Boktryckeri AB (DTBAB). Prior to the merger, Falu-Kuriren operated the independent liberal newspaper Falu Kuriren and DTBAB owned the apolitical newspapers Borlänge Tidning, Nya Ludvika Tidning, Mora Tidning, and Södra Dalarnes Tidning. The political leanings of the newspapers were maintained after the merger and through to the current day.

The newspapers of DT cover different parts of Dalarna County (Swedish: Dalarnas län), which has a population around 285,000 (2017), and had a combined circulation of 65,000 copies in 2005. Dalarnas Tidningar's primary competitor is the social-democratic Dala-Demokraten, which had 18,600 subscribers in 2007, according to Tidningsstatistik AB.

Dalarnas Tidningar was acquired by Mittmedia in 2007, which was later taken over by the Bonnier Group in 2019.
