= Michail Boiadjiev =

Bulgarian violinist

- Михаил Бояджиев
- Born: 7 October 1934; Dupnitza, Bulgaria
- Died: 22 July 2016 (aged 81); Dupnitza, Bulgaria
- Occupation: Violinist

Michail Boiadjiev was a Bulgarian violinist who was known for his contributions to Swedish orchestra.

== Early life ==
Boiadijev was born on 7 October 1934 in Dupnitsa, Bulgaria.

== Career ==
From 1 August 1967 to 31 December 1969, he was employed as a violinist in the Norrköping Symfoniorkester in Sweden. On 30 December 1969, he signed. with the Gothenburg Symphony Orchestra and Grand Theatre in Sweden as prime concertmaster of the orchestra, lecturer at the summer academy in Vadstena, and founder of the music association 'Musica Viva'.

In the 1970s, Boiadjiev, who had obtained Swedish nationality, was frequently featured in the Swedish press.

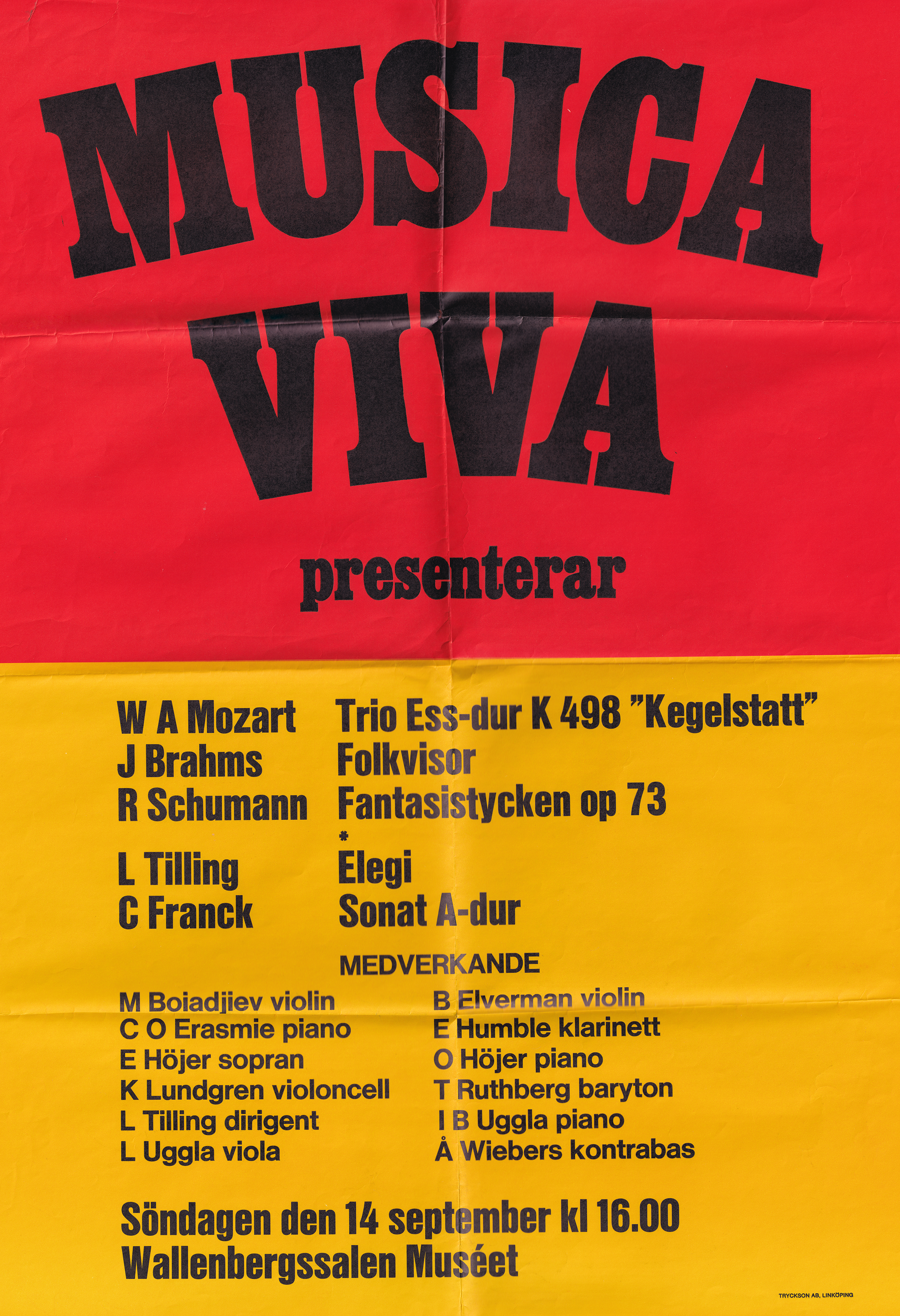
Musica Viva Banner – Association Founded by Micha Boiadjiev (Violinist)

From 1 May 1971 to May 1974, Mr. Boiadjiev became the 1st violin concertmaster in the orchestra of Wuppertal at the State University of Music Rheinland – Köln University of Music in Cologne, West Germany, also serving as a teacher at the Music School of Schwelm, North Rhine-Westphalia.

From 1974 to 1978, he lived in Sweden and served as the concertmaster of the Sörmland Chamber Orchestra, performing both as a soloist and in a pedagogical role. In 1976, the Swedish newspaper Södermanlands Nyheter (SN) recognized Prof. Michail Boiadjiev for his significant contribution to the music scene in Nyköping. The article highlighted his role as an internationally renowned violinist, noting his involvement with the music school and the Philharmonic Orchestra, where his expertise and performances provided a vital boost to the cultural life of the region.

From 1979, he resided in Heidelberg, serving as the First violin Concertmaster of the Philharmonic Orchestra Heidelberg.
