= Lennart Grebelius =

Swedish businessman

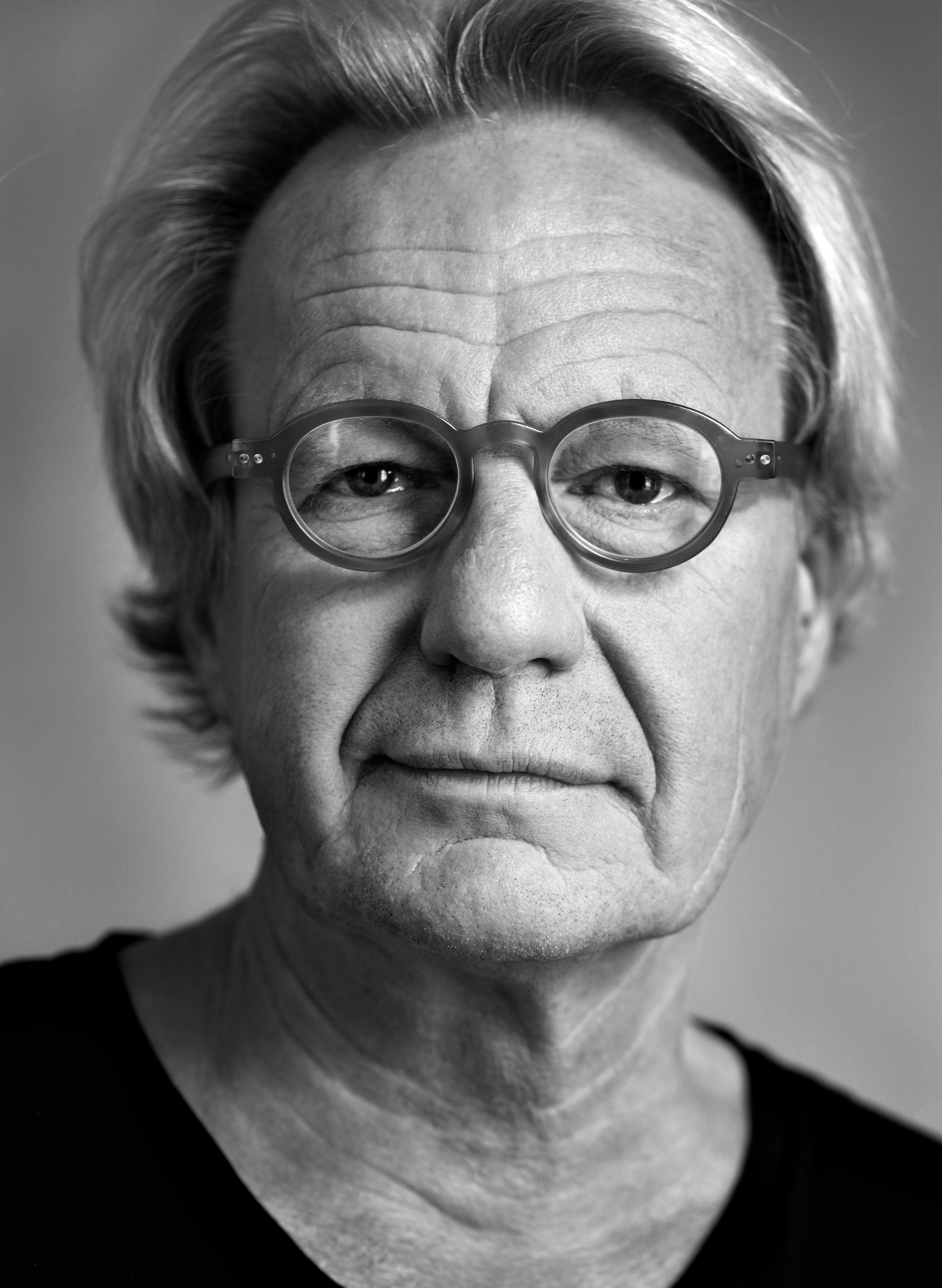
A portrait of Lennart Grebelius

Nils Lennart Grebelius (born March 29, 1953) is a Swedish businessman and philanthropist.

== Biography ==
Lennart Grebelius started working in the family business, then named Nilssons Trikåfabrik AB but since renamed Sätila of Sweden, in 1974 and became the CEO of the company in 1985. After the Swedish financial crisis of the early 1990s he started investing in real estate in Gothenburg and Stockholm, and eventually also in London. He is the head of his own wholly owned venture capital company, which manages about 500 million SEK.

Grebelius's holdings are centered in the investment company Sätila Holding AB, which has its headquarters in Gothenburg. This company had a gross revenue of 82 million SEK in 2014. In 2008, his net worth was estimated by Affärsvärlden to be 1.4 billion SEK.

== Philanthropy ==
Grebelius has been involved in the street newspaper Faktum, which is sold by the homeless and socially marginalized, since its inception. The newspaper started in Gothenburg in 2001 and is now sold in nine additional cities in the south of Sweden. in 2009 Grebelius also contributed seed funding for the company Mitt Liv, which has as its mission to help integrate immigrants into Swedish society (with the ultimate goal of employment) through professional networks and contacts. Lennart was previously on the board of Mitt Liv, which is active in Gothenburg, Stockholm, Malmö and Norrköping.

== Awards ==
- H. M. The King's Medal in gold, of the 12th size (Kon:sGM12 2021) for valuable contributions within Swedish industry
