= Finnegan's Hell =

Swedish punk band

Finnegan's Hell is a Celtic punk band from Sweden, and the driving force behind "The New Wave of Swedish Celtic Punk".

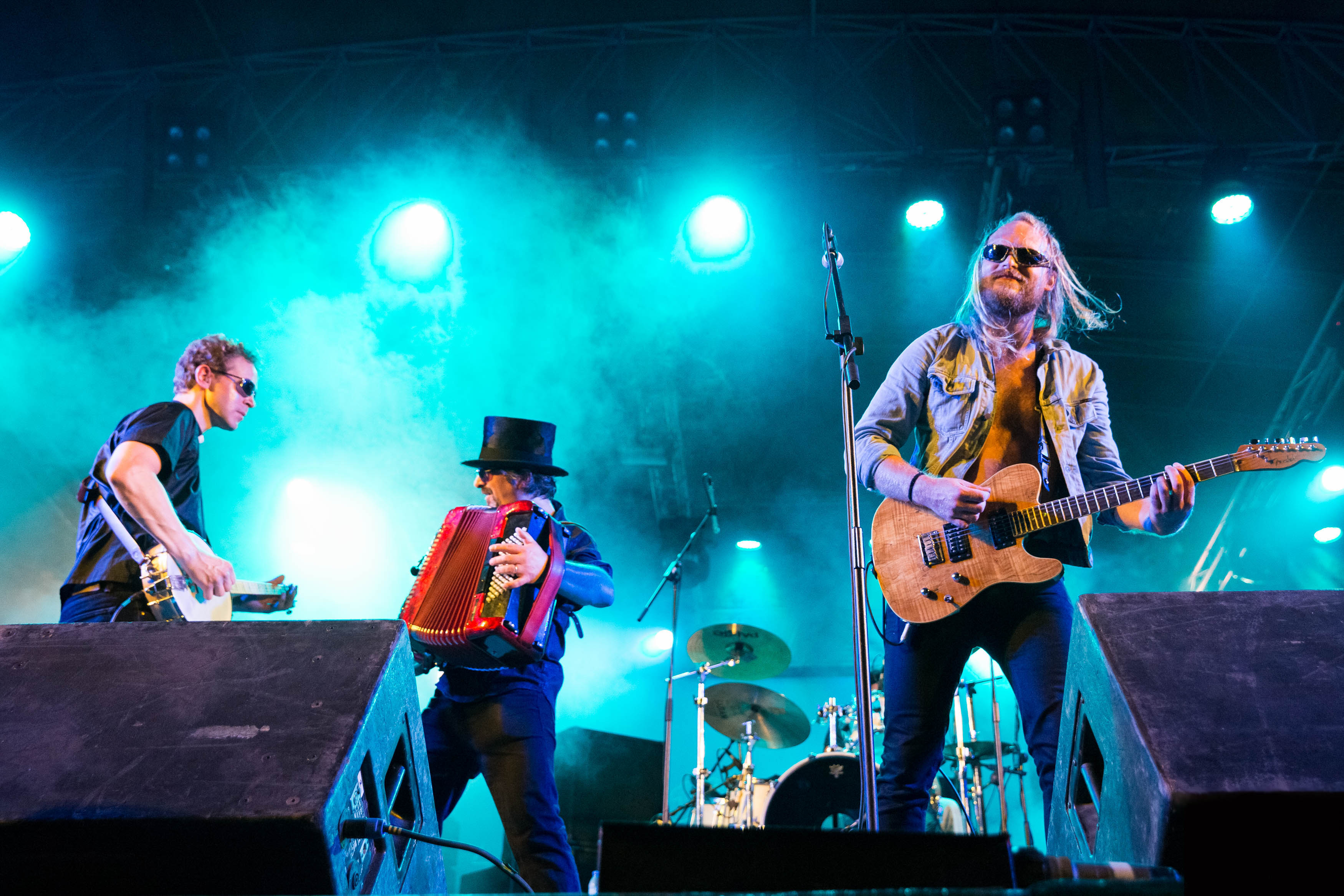

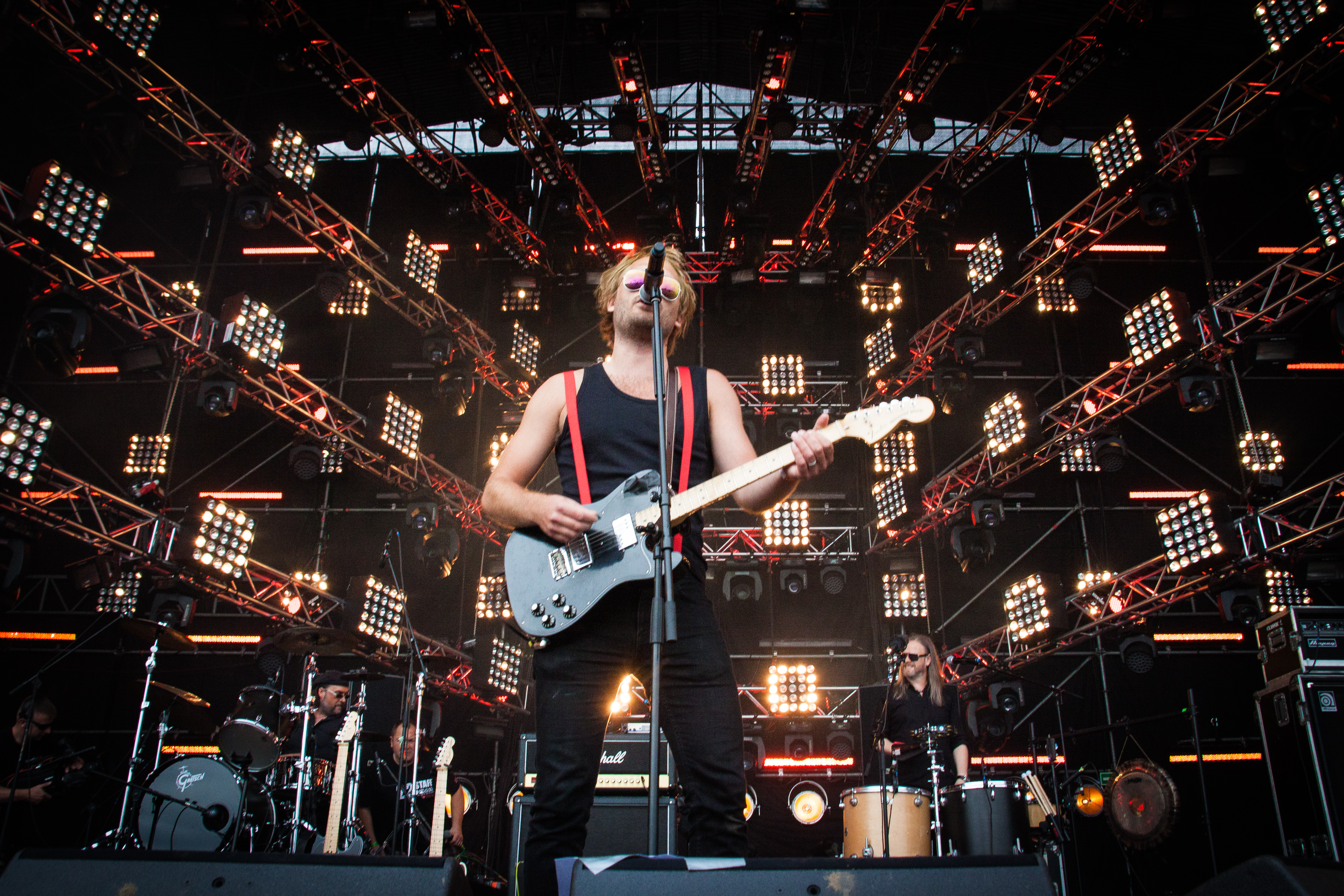

The band was formed in 2010. After a year of touring Finnegan's Hell released the EP "The Molly Maguires" in 2011, the title track of which put the band on the European Celtic punk map. The following year Finnegan's Hell recorded the song "The Boys in Green Will Conquer" and took part in a competition in Ireland, aimed at finding the official Euro 2012 anthem for Ireland's soccer team. The Irish Times were intrigued by the band and wrote: "They’re hard to describe, but just imagine a blend of Metallica and the Kilfenora céilí Band and you’d be about right."

Finnegan's Hell caught the attention of the media when releasing the song "Drunken Christmas" in 2013. The song was voted "Christmas song of the year" by the readers of the Swedish music magazine Gaffa. The controversial video for the song was described by rock journalist Håkan Engström at Sydsvenska Dagbladet as "Celtic social realism, probably the best Celtic social realism in the world". In 2015 the American group Highland Reign covered "Drunken Christmas" on the album "A Celtic Christmas".

After signing to Heptown Records and the publisher Sound Pollution Songs, Finnegan's Hell released their first full-length album, Drunk, Sick And Blue in 2014. Internationally the album was well-received, for example by German rock magazine OX Fanzine, Celtic Life International as well as Celtic Folk Punk blog. Paddy Rock Radio rated "Drunk, Sick And Blue" as one of the best Celtic punk releases of the year.

Finnegan's Hell is the only Swedish band ever to have performed for two consecutive years at Woodstock Festival in Poland. After performing at Woodstock Festival in 2015, the band was brought back by the audience through a voting system called "The Golden Spinning Contest", thus earning the band the opportunity to perform at Woodstock Festival's main stage in 2016.
