= Gertrud Larsson =

Swedish comedian and playwright

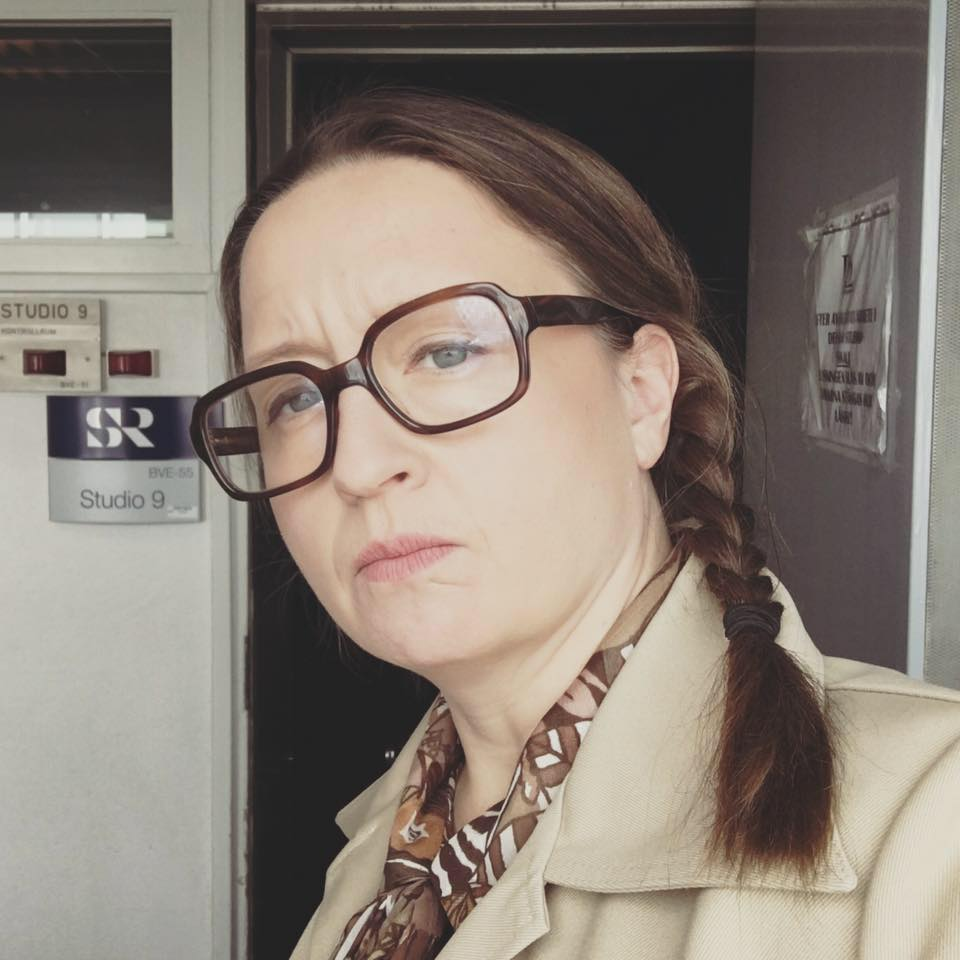
- Born: 10 November 1972
- Died: Kristianstad, Sweden
- Occupations: Playwright, comedian

Gertrud Larsson (born 10 November 1972) is a Swedish playwright, and author.

== Early life and career in comedy ==
Larsson was born in Kristianstad in 1972, and was educated at the Dramatic Institute in Stockholm. During high school she met Åsa Asptjärn with whom, together with others, she subsequently formed the theatre troop Trollpackorna ("Troll Pack"). Later they also formed the comedy duo Åsa & Gertrud, and in the period 1996-2000 regularly performed on the Swedish radio program Freja. In 2020, Åsa & Gertrud won Expressen's Ankan award for satire, and the pair have also written Swedish Radio's Christmas calendar in 2015 and 2021.

== Career in drama ==
Larsson made her debut as a playwright in 1998 and has worked as a freelance playwright since 2004. In 2009 she received the Kristianstadsbladet Culture and Entertainment Prize. Larsson also received the 2014 Kristianstad municipal award for culture, including prize money of 50,000 Swedish krona, and in the same year received the Swedish Ibsen Society's Ibsen Prize. The newspaper Svenska Dagbladet described her, in a February 2014 review of her play Hela folkets järnväg ("The whole people's railway"), as "Sweden's Brecht" due to what they described as her sharp focus on topical societal issues, including on issues in the Swedish chicken-farming industry, the Swedish Migration Agency, and the Swedish Social Insurance Agency.
