= Nya Ludvika Tidning =

Swedish newspaper

Nya Ludvika Tidning is a local Swedish daily newspaper with distribution in Ludvika and Smedjebacken municipalities. The product of a merger between two other local newspapers published since 1892 and 1910, it was first published on 1 October 1993. The paper is published in tabloid format.

In February 2002, it was purchased by Dalarnas Tidningar.

The paper had a circulation of 9,100 copies in 2005 according to Tidningsstatistik AB.
