= Åsa Asptjärn =

Swedish comedian and author (born 1972)

- Born: 3 May 1972
- Died: Boden, Sweden
- Occupation(s): Children's author, comedian

Åsa Asptjärn (born 3 May 1972) is a Swedish comedian, and author.

== Early life and career in comedy ==
Asptjärn was born in Boden in 1972, and subsequently grew up in Kristianstad. Whilst living in Kristianstad, she met Gertrud Larsson with whom, together with others, she subsequently formed the theatre troop Trollpackorna ("Troll Pack"). Later they also formed the comedy duo Åsa & Gertrud, and in the period 1996-2000 regularly performed on the Swedish radio program Freja. In 2020, Åsa & Gertrud won Expressen's Ankan award for satire, and the pair have also written Swedish Radio's Christmas calendar in 2015 and 2021.

== Literary career ==
In 2014 Asptjärn made her debut as an author with the book Konsten att ha sjukt låga förväntningar ("The art of sickly low expectations"), a book for children and young people about a teenager called Emmanuel Kent. A further book about Kent, called Manifest för hopplösa ("Manifesto for the hopeless") followed in 2015, with a further book in the series (Rimligt lyckade ögonblick, or "Reasonably successful moments") following in January 2017. In September 2017 the Swedish literature magazine Litteratur Magazinet, described Asptjärn as "one of Sweden's best children and youth writers".

== Personal life ==
Asptjärn is married with three children, and lives in Malmö.
