= Throne of a Thousand Years =

1996 non-fiction book by Jacob Demitz

Throne of a Thousand Years: Chronicles as Told by Erik, Son of Riste, Commemorating Sweden's Monarchy from 995–96 to 1995–1996
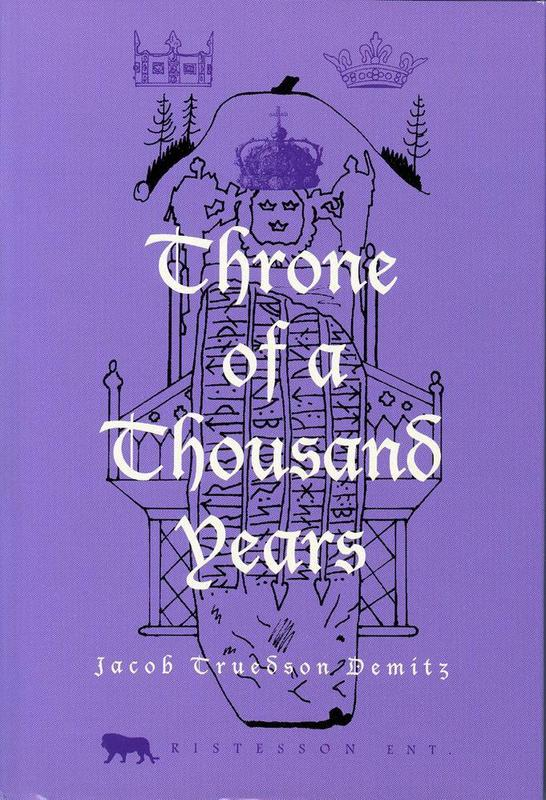
- Front of the dust cover of Throne of a Thousand Years from 1996.
- Author: Jacob Truedson Demitz
- Language: English
- Subject: Swedish history
- Publisher: Ristesson Ent
- Publication date: December 19, 1996
- Publication place: Sweden and United States
- Pages: 332
- ISBN: 978-91-630-5030-5
- OCLC: 36647578
- LC Class: DL644.1 .D46 1996

Throne of a Thousand Years is a non-fiction book by author Jacob Truedson Demitz, first published in 1996 and again in 2020 as Centuries of Selfies. It was the first English-language historical account solely about the monarchs of Sweden.

It details their personal histories, the impact of their reigns on Scandinavian history, and the political implications of disclosed dynastic ties in Europe.

Sponsored mainly by Ericsson, ABB and the Swedish Postal Service, the 1996 account was published by Ristesson Ent in Ludvika and Los Angeles. A fictional chronicler called Erik, Son of Riste relates the factual story, followed by fact boxes about each of the 66 monarchs covered and a number of ancestry charts. Illustrations in the 1996 version (if not otherwise noted in the book) are portrait drawings by the author made from the 1960s to the 1990s, and 3 differently sorted lists of persons were included as well as an appended text rendition in Swedish.

== Reception ==
Throne of a Thousand Years was particularly praised by Dala-Demokraten for its English-language name forms, exonyms for pre-20th-century Swedish royalty, and a "refreshing" lack of nationalism, and by Nya Ludvika Tidning for its general interest and for easy access to hard-to-find facts.

== 2020 edition ==
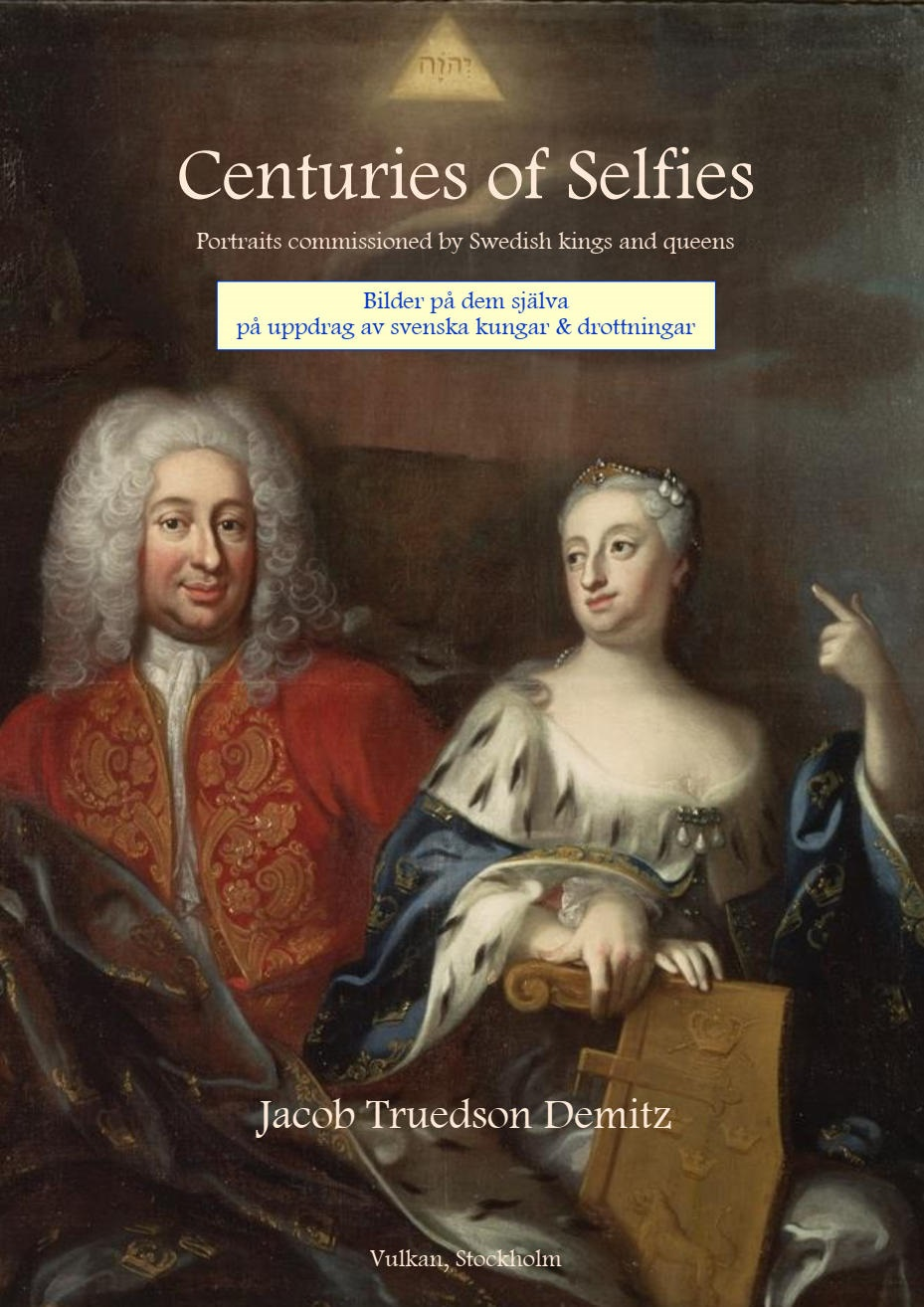

Making extensive use of donations from 2016 on, by the National Museum of Sweden to Wikimedia Commons, a new full color edition called Centuries of Selfies was published in 2020 with a preface by Ulf Sundberg. In the updated version's historical account, Erik, Son of Riste has been excluded, whereas comprehensive new chapters covering the royal dynasties and burials, respectively, have been added to the book.
