= TT language =

The TT language (Swedish: TT-språket) is a style guide from the Swedish news agency Tidningarnas Telegrambyrå (TT). It contains recommendations on how media of Sweden should express themselves in writing in order to maintain good use of language.
