= Lars Stjernkvist =

Swedish politician (born 1955)

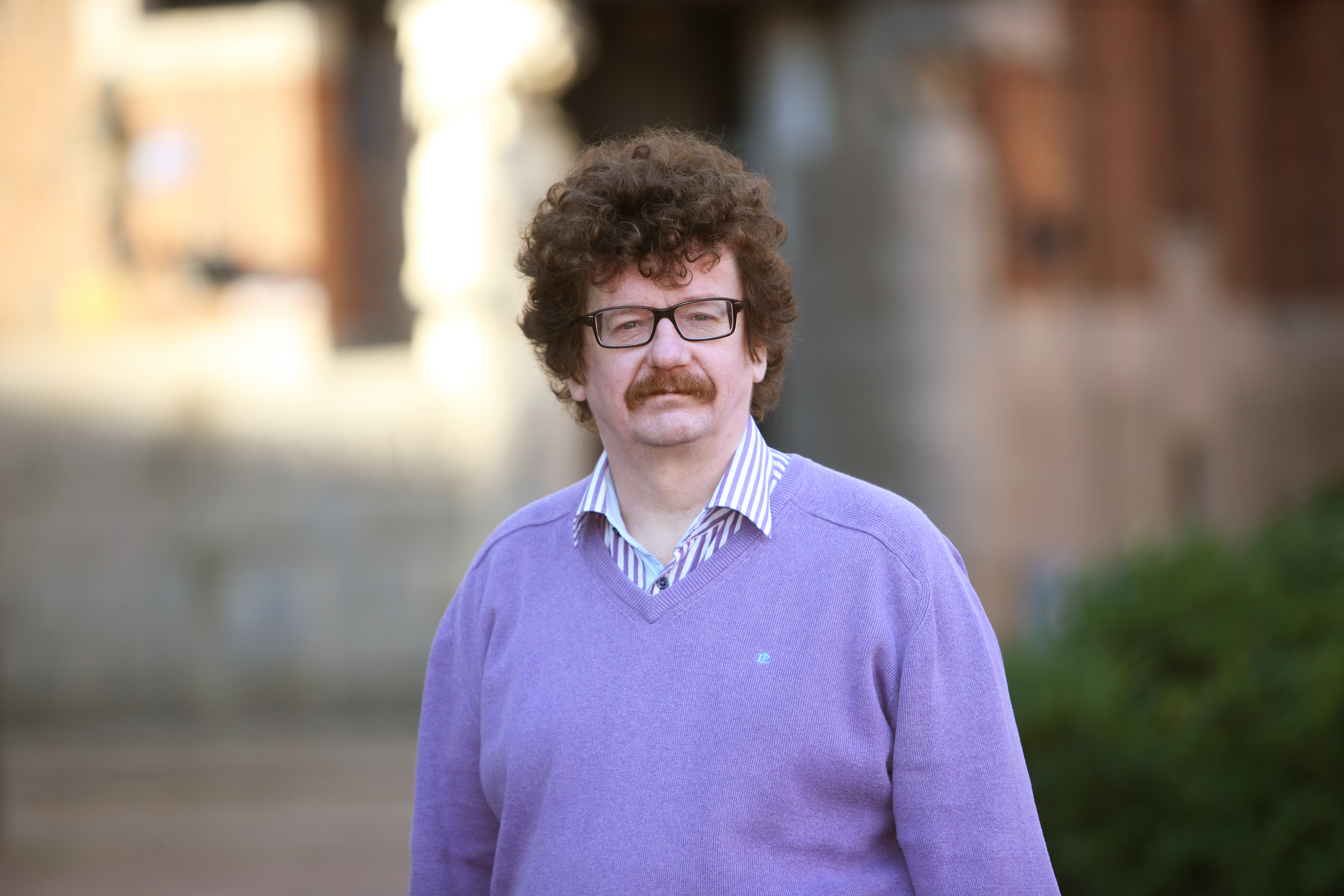

Secretary General of Swedish Social Democratic Party
- In office 1999–2004
- Preceded by: Ingela Thalén
- Succeeded by: Marita Ulvskog

Personal details
- Born: Lars Gunnar Stjernkvist; 1955 (age 70–71) Motala, Östergötlands, Sweden
- Party: Swedish Social Democratic Party

Lars Stjernkvist (born 1955) is a Swedish politician and journalist. He served as the secretary general of the Swedish Social Democratic Party between 1982 and 1992. He also served at the Parliament from 1991 and 1998.

== Biography ==
Stjernkvist was born in Motala, Östergötlands, in 1955. He joined the Social Democratic Party on 24 October 1975. He was appointed chairman of the party's Östergötlands organization. Next he moved to Norrköping where he worked for a local newspaper entitled Folkbladet. He was elected to the Parliament on 30 September 1991, and his tenure ended on 11 May 1998. Then he served as director general of now-defunct Swedish Integration Agency from 1998 to 2000. In 1999 he was named as the secretary general of the Social Democratic Party, replacing Ingela Thalén in the post. Stjernkvist's term ended in 2004, and he was replaced by Marita Ulvskog as party's secretary general.

Stjernkvist became a municipal councilor in Norrköping in 2007. Then he was appointed chairman of the Norrköping municipal board in 2010. He resigned from the office in September 2020.

Following his resignation from the post Stjernkvist has been working as a journalist for the local newspapers in Norrköping. He joined the Swedish Postcode Foundation as a board member in May 2021.
