= Prince Carl Oscar, Duke of Södermanland =

Swedish prince (1852–54)

Prince Carl Oscar
- Duke of Södermanland
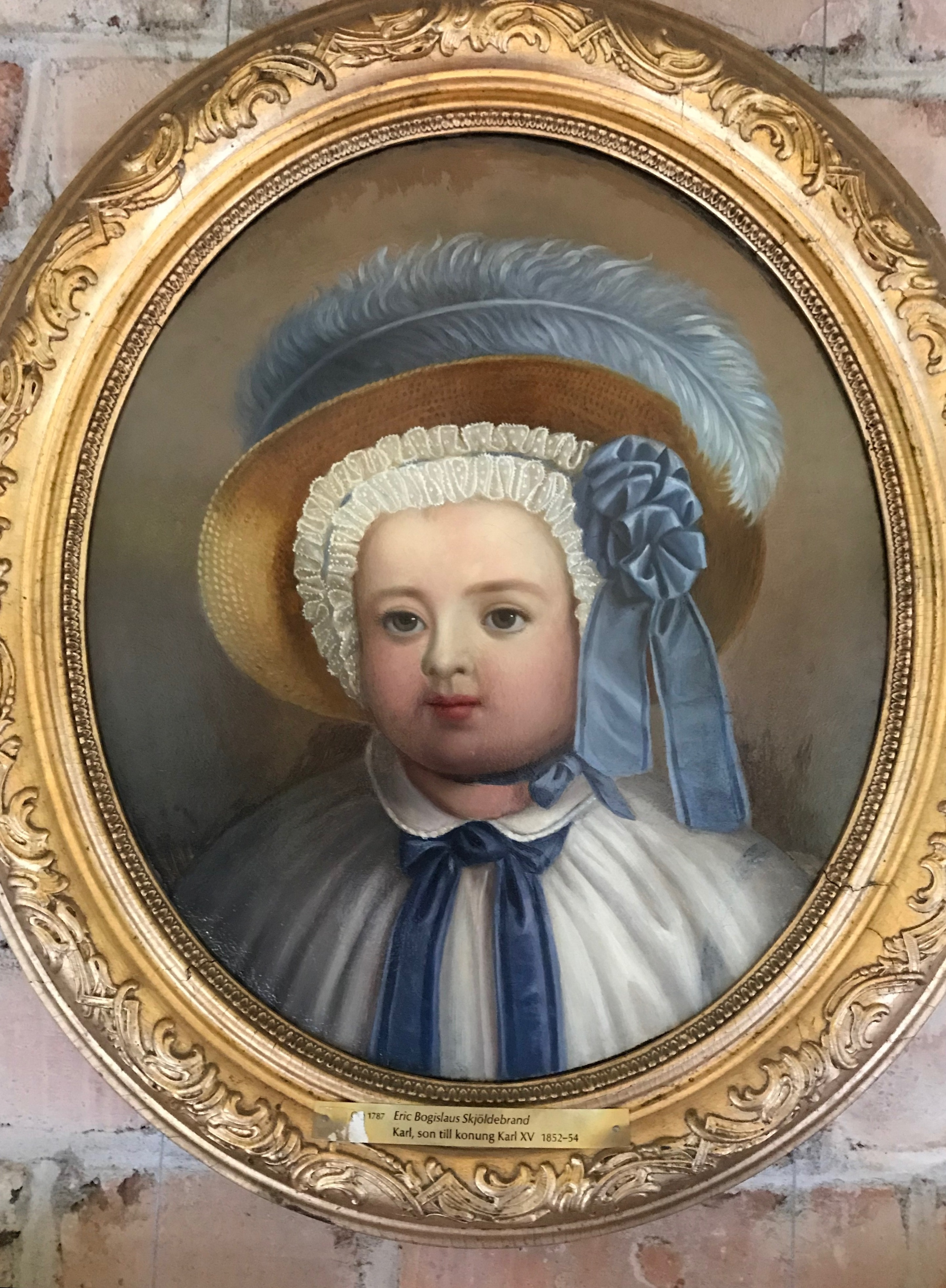
- Born: 14 December 1852; Stockholm Palace, Sweden
- Died: 13 March 1854 (1 year 2 months); Stockholm Palace, Stockholm, Sweden
Names
- Carl Oscar Vilhelm Fredrik
- House: Bernadotte
- Father: Charles XV
- Mother: Louise of the Netherlands

Prince Carl Oscar of Sweden, Duke of Södermanland (Carl Oscar Vilhelm Frederik; 14 December 1852 – 13 March 1854) was a prince of Sweden and Norway.

== Early life and ancestry ==
Coat of arms of Prince Carl Oscar of Sweden

Born in the Stockholm Palace, Carl Oscar Vilhelm Frederick was the only son and younger child in the marriage of Crown Prince Charles (later King Charles XV and IV) of the United Kingdoms of Sweden and Norway and his wife, Princess Louise of the Netherlands. By birth, he was member of the House of Bernadotte, Swedish royal family of French ancestry. He had one elder sibling, Princess Louise of Sweden who would become Queen consort of Denmark.

During his short life, Carl Oskar was second in line to the throne of Sweden and Norway, after his father, and was also Duke of Södermanland. As a result of his early death and his father's lack of legitimate male heirs, his uncle, Prince Oscar Fredrik eventually inherited the throne of Sweden and Norway as King Oscar II.

== Death ==
In February 1854 the young prince suffered from measles and was prescribed a cold bath. He died shortly after of pneumonia, in Stockholm palace, at the age of just 15 months on 13 March 1854. He is interred in a royal vault of the Riddarholmen Church in Stockholm, Sweden.

== Ancestry ==
Ancestors of Prince Carl Oscar, Duke of Södermanland

8. Charles XIV John of Sweden
4. Oscar I of Sweden
9. Désirée Clary
2. Charles XV of Sweden
10. Eugène de Beauharnais
5. Duchess Josephine of Leuchtenberg
11. Princess Augusta of Bavaria
1. Prince Carl Oscar of Sweden
12. William I of the Netherlands
6. Prince Frederik of the Netherlands
13. Princess Wilhelmine of Prussia
3. Princess Louise of the Netherlands
14. Frederick William III of Prussia
7. Princess Louise of Prussia
15. Duchess Louise of Mecklenburg-Strelitz

== Source ==
- Demitz, Jacob Truedson (2020). Centuries of Selfies: Portraits commissioned by Swedish kings and queens. Preface by Ulf Sundberg. Stockholm; New York: Vulkan Förlag. pp. 81, 134 & 166. ISBN 978-91-89179-63-9.

Prince Carl Oscar, Duke of Södermanland House of Bernadotte Born: 14 December 1852 Died: 13 March 1854
Swedish royalty
Preceded by Oscar I	Duke of Södermanland	Succeeded by Prince Vilhelm, Duke of Södermanland
