= Norrländska Socialdemokraten =

Swedish newspaper

- Type: Daily newspaper
- Format: Tabloid
- Owner(s): Norrbottens Media AB (Norrköpings Tidningar 51 %, Piteå-Tidningen 25,3 %, Valrossen AB 23,7 %)
- Editor: Mats Ehnbom
- Founded: 1918
- Political alignment: Social democratic
- Language: Swedish
- Headquarters: Robertsviksgatan 5, Luleå
- Circulation: 10,000 (2024)
- Website: https://www.nsd.se

Norrländska Socialdemokraten (NSD) (Swedish: The Norrland Social Democrat) is a daily regional newspaper published in Norrbotten County, Sweden.

== History and profile ==
As of the division of the Swedish Social Democratic Workers' Party in May 1917, NSD was founded in 1918 because the original regional organ for the party, Norrskensflamman, went with the vast majority of the social democratic district to join the newly founded Swedish Social Democratic Left Party. The newspaper was first published on 4 January 1919, and the stated position of the editorial page is "social democratic".

In 2010 it was the largest morning newspaper in the region, as well as the largest newspaper published north of Uppsala with a circulation of 35,600. The circulation of the paper was 32,300 copies in 2011. The paper had a circulation of 31,000 copies in 2012 and 30,100 copies in 2013.

== See also ==
- List of Swedish newspapers
