= Åsa & Gertrud =

Swedish comedy double act

- Born: Gertrud Larsson: 10 November 1972, Kristianstad, Sweden; Åsa Asptjärn: 2 May 1972, Boden, Sweden

Comedy career
- Years active: 1993–present
- Medium: Television and radio
- Genre: satire

Åsa Asptjärn and Gertrud Larsson are a Swedish comedy double-act.

== History ==
Asptjärn and Larsson first met in Kristianstad when both were studying in a local high school. Together with others, they subsequently formed the theatre troop Trollpackorna ("Troll Pack"). Later they also formed the comedy duo Åsa & Gertrud, and in the period 1996-2000 regularly performed on the Swedish radio program Freja. In 2020, Åsa & Gertrud won Expressen's Ankan award for satire, and the pair have also written Swedish Radio's Christmas calendar in 2015 and 2021.

== Utkantssverige ==
Since 2016 Asptjärn and Larsson have produced and performed in a regular comedy sketch called Utkantssverige ("Outlying Sweden") on Swedish Radio's P1 channel. In the series the duo play radio journalists called Lena and Kristel investigating events in fictional towns outside Stockholm, satirising typical Stockholm-based coverage of events in the rest of the country. Their sketch "Feminist Nuclear Weapons" was nominated by Swedish Radio as their submission for the 2021 Prix Europa in the category of Best European Radio Fiction Series of the Year 2021. The sketch received the Special Commendation of the board for that category.
