= Pascal Engman =

Swedish crime author

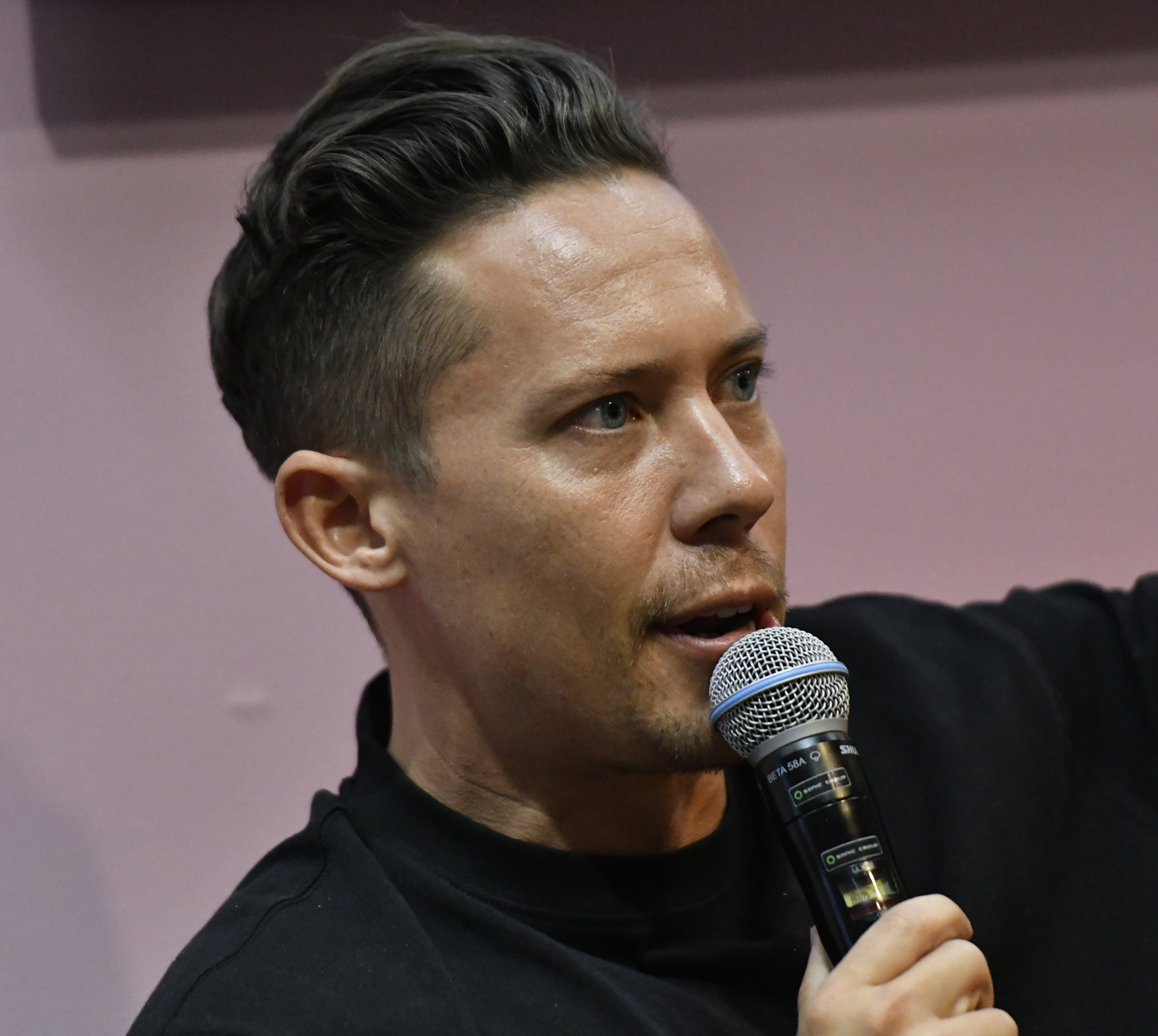
Pascal Engman at the Göteborg Book Fair in 2024

Pascal Carl Orlando Engman Murchio is a Swedish author and journalist. He is known for his crime fiction series featuring police detective Vanessa Frank, beginning with Eldslandet (The land of fire) in 2018. His works have been published in at least 19 languages, including English.

== Early life and education ==
Pascal Carl Orlando Engman Murchio was born in Stockholm, Sweden, to a Swedish mother and a Chilean father.

== Journalism ==
Engman began his professional life as a journalist, working first at the regional newspaper Trelleborgs Allehanda, then at online magazine Nyheter24, then at the Swedish evening newspaper Expressen.

== Writing career ==
Engman's debut novel, Patrioterna (The Patriots), was published in Sweden in 2017.

Soon after publishing, the TV rights to Patrioterna were sold to Fabrik Entertainment in Los Angeles, the production company behind Amazon Prime's Bosch series and AMC's The Killing.

Following that stand-alone title, he began writing a series about police detective Vanessa Frank. As of 2022, there were four titles in the Vanessa Frank series: Eldslandet (The land of fire), Råttkungen (The rat king), Änkorna (The widows) and Kokain (Cocaine). Råttkungen is the first of these to be published in English, under the title Femicide, by Legend Press as part of a three-book deal. Femicide has already sold over 100,000 copies in Sweden alone.

As of 2022 the Vanessa Frank series is sold in over 20 countries and has been translated into 19 languages including English, German, Italian, Polish, and Spanish.

=== Critical reception ===
Portrayed as a rising star in Scandinavian crime fiction, Engman has been called "the master of the new generation" by David Lagercrantz, the author of the later books in the Millennium series.

== Other activities ==
In 2020, Engman founded the Pascal Engman Foundation, which works to promote reading among children and young people in Sweden. The foundation was officially launched in 2021. Its main activity is to award an annual scholarship ("Reading Promoter of the Year") to an individual or an organisation that has made significant contributions in this field. The prize committee awarding the scholarship each year consists of several prominent media personalities, including former SVT CEO Eva Hamilton.

== Selected works ==
- Patrioterna (The Patriots), 2017

=== The Vanessa Frank series ===
- Eldslandet (The land of fire), 2018
- Råttkungen (The rat king), 2019. Published in English by Legend Press under the title Femicide, 2022.
- Änkorna (The widows), 2020
- Kokain (Cocaine), 2021
