= Falu-Kuriren =

Local newspaper in Falu, Sweden

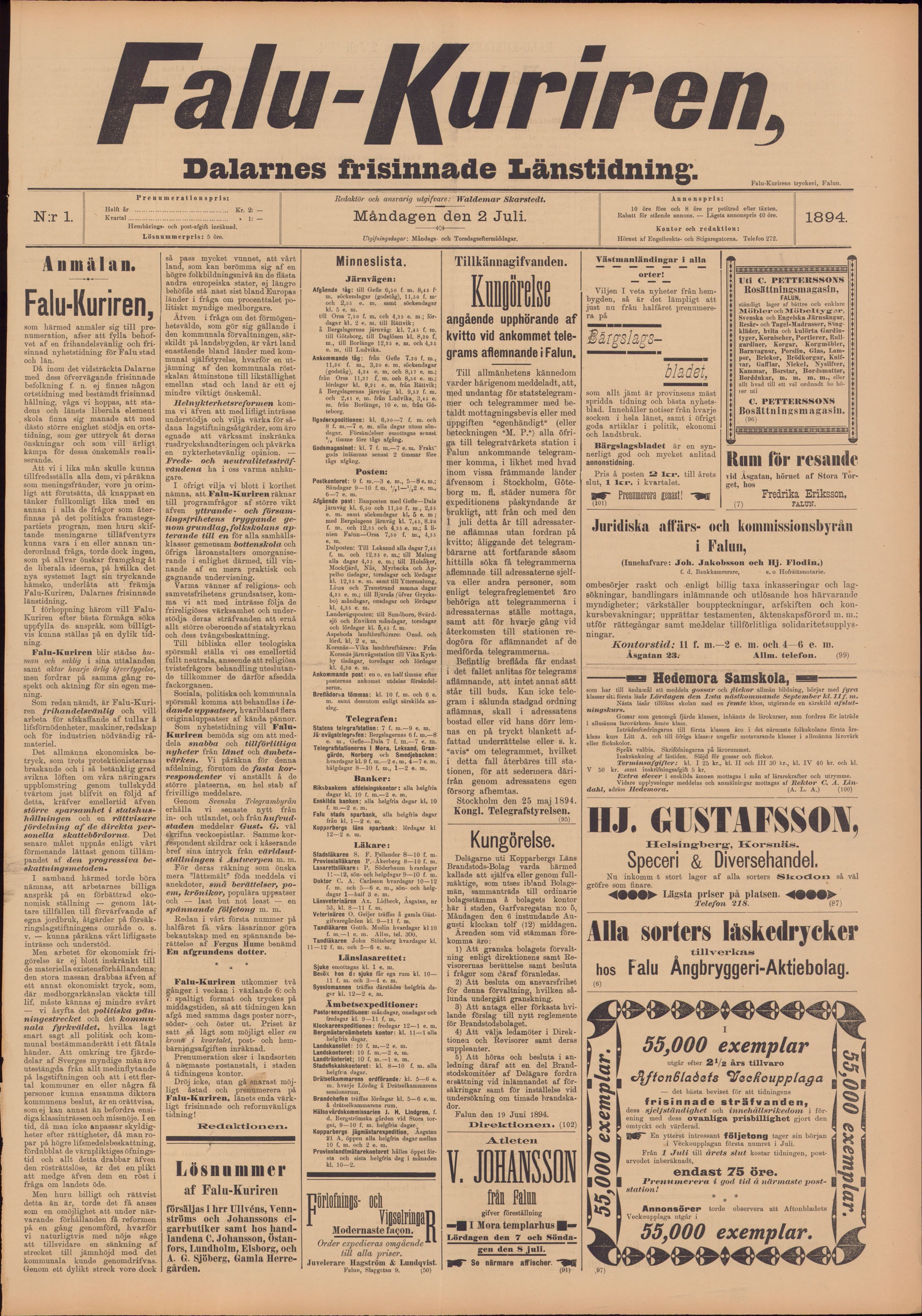
- Cover page of the first issue dated 2 July 1894
- Type: Local newspaper
- Format: Tabloid
- Owner(s): Mittmedia
- Founder(s): Waldemar Skarstedt
- Publisher: Dalarnas Tidningar
- Founded: 1894
- Political alignment: Independent liberal
- Language: Swedish
- Headquarters: Falun
- Country: Sweden
- Website: www.falukuriren.se

Falu-Kuriren (lit. 'The Falun Courier') is a local newspaper published in Falun, Dalarna County, Sweden, by Dalarnas Tidningar, a subsidiary of the Bonnier Group.

== History and profile ==
Falu-Kuriren was established by Waldemar Skarstedt in 1894. The paper has its headquarters in Falun and its political stance is independent liberal (Swedish: oberoende liberal). It is published in tabloid format. In 2008, it was acquired by Mittmedia, and is fully owned by the company.

Falu-Kuriren sold 29,400 copies in 1996.
