= Folkbladet =

Daily local newspaper in Sweden

- Type: Daily newspaper
- Owner: NTM Group
- Founded: 1905
- Ceased publication: 2024
- Language: Swedish
- Headquarters: Norrköping
- Country: Sweden
- Sister newspapers: Norrköpings Tidningar
- ISSN: 1103-9272
- Website: http://www.folkbladet.se/nyheter/

Folkbladet ("The People's Paper") was a Swedish-language newspaper published in Norrköping, Sweden. The paper was in circulation from 1905 to 2024.

== History and profile ==
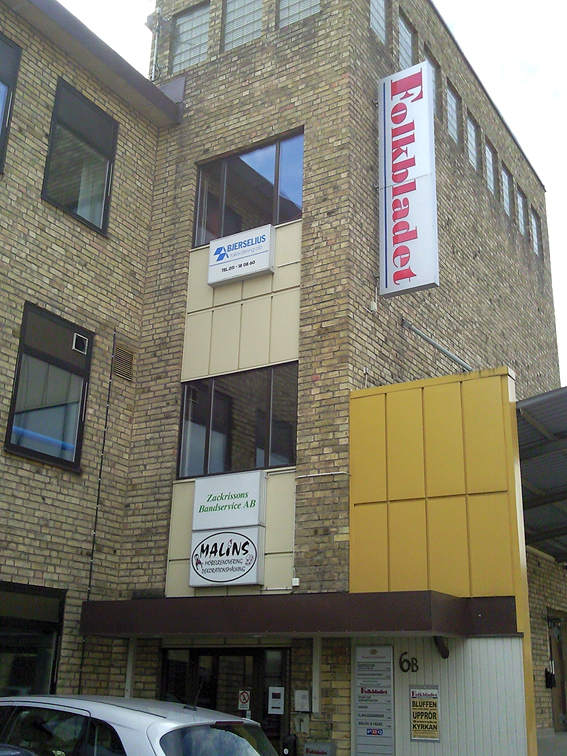
Folkbladet headquarters in Norrköping

The paper was founded by workers with the name Östergötlands Folkblad in 1905. In 1998 it was renamed Folkbladet. The paper was headquartered in Norrköping and owned by the Norrköping Tidningar AB (NTM Group). The company acquired the paper in 2000. Norrköpings Tidningar became its sister paper of following this acquisition.

Before this transaction Folkbladet had a social democratic political stance. When it was a social democratic publication one of its contributors was Lars Stjernkvist, a social democrat politician and future secretary general of the Swedish Social Democratic Party.

In 2010 Folkbladet sold 6,500 copies.

== See also ==
- List of Swedish newspapers
