= Aluma (newspaper) =

Swedish street newspaper

Aluma is a street newspaper sold by the homeless in Malmö, Lund and Helsingborg, Sweden. It was established in 2001.

In 2006, it was awarded the grand prize of Publicistklubben (Swedish Publicists' Association) together with its sister papers Situation Sthlm and Faktum.
