= Norran =

Swedish newspaper

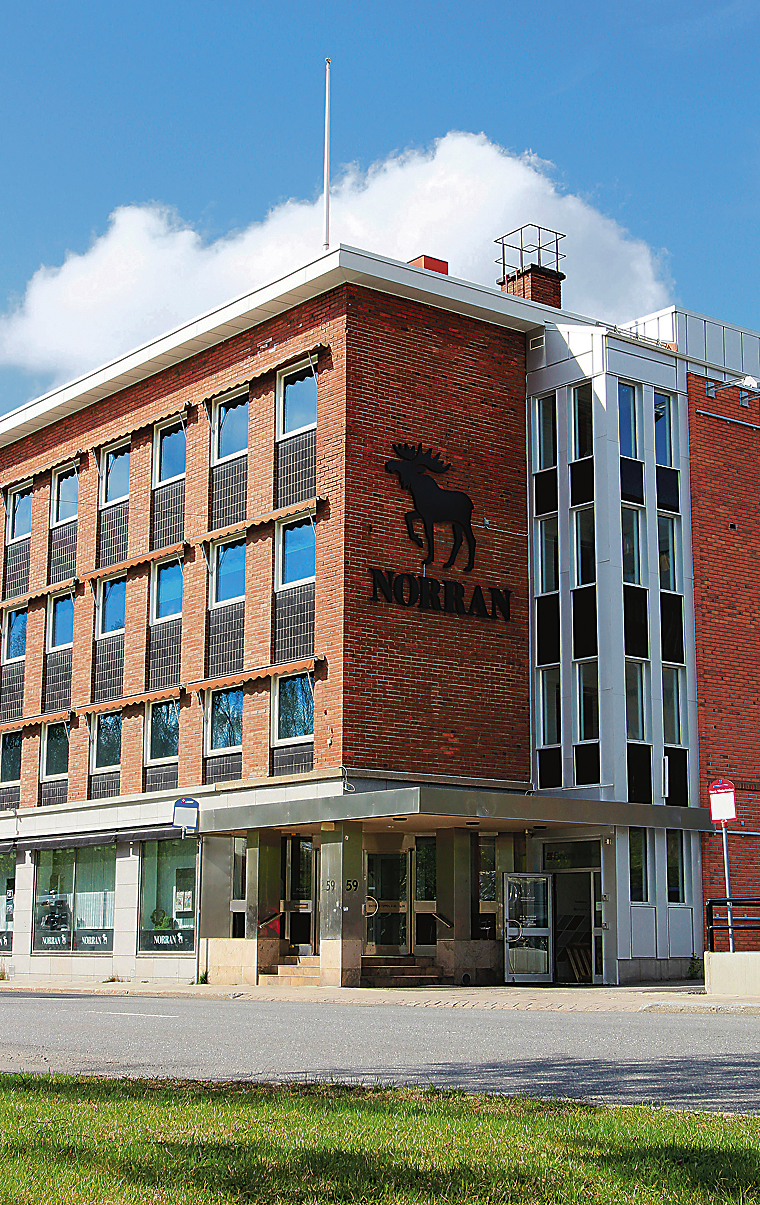
- Norran huset
- Type: Newspaper
- Format: Berliner
- Owner: Skelleftepress
- Founder: Anton Wikström
- Founded: 1910; 116 years ago
- Language: Swedish
- Headquarters: Skellefteå
- Circulation: 22,700 (2013)
- Website: Norran

Norran (previously named Norra Västerbotten) is a Swedish language liberal newspaper published in Skellefteå, Sweden.

== History and profile ==
Norran was founded by a group of liberal newspaper enthusiasts led by Anton Wikström from Jörn in 1910. The first official edition was published 1 January 1911. The paper is owned by the foundation Skelleftepress. It is published in Berliner format in Skellefteå, and chiefly distributed in the northern parts of Västerbotten. The stated position of the editorial is liberal.

Most of the newspaper's local articles are written in Skellefteå, but it also has local editors in Arjeplog, Arvidsjaur, Malå and Norsjö.

It has been published on the Internet since February 1996 and the main news service is freely available.

In correlation with the newspaper's 100-year-anniversary, the staff announced on 4 January 2010 that its name would be changed into Norran, a name which has been used by its readers for decades. The official web site's URL was already norran.se.

In February 2023, as the new electric battery factory Northvolt started to recruit English-speaking staff from all over the world, Norran launched an English-language news service, Norran English, edited by former UK national newspaper journalist, Paul Connolly. Norran was the first newspaper in Sweden to launch an English-language service.

== Circulation ==
In 1959 the circulation of the paper was 24,000 copies. The paper had a circulation of 23,200 copies in 2012 and 22,700 copies in 2013.

== Editors-in-chief ==
- Anton Wikström 1913–1935
- Zolo Stärner 1935–1953
- K H Wikström 1953–1978
- Rolf Brandt 1978–1989
- Stig Ericsson 1989–1997
- Birger Thuresson 1997–1999
- Ola Theander 1999-2004
- Sofia Olsson Olsén 2004–2006
- Anders Steinvall 2006–2008
- Anette Novak 2009–2011
- Lars Andersson 2012–

== See also ==
- List of Swedish newspapers
- Dik Manusch
