= Ulf Sundberg =

Swedish economist, historian and author

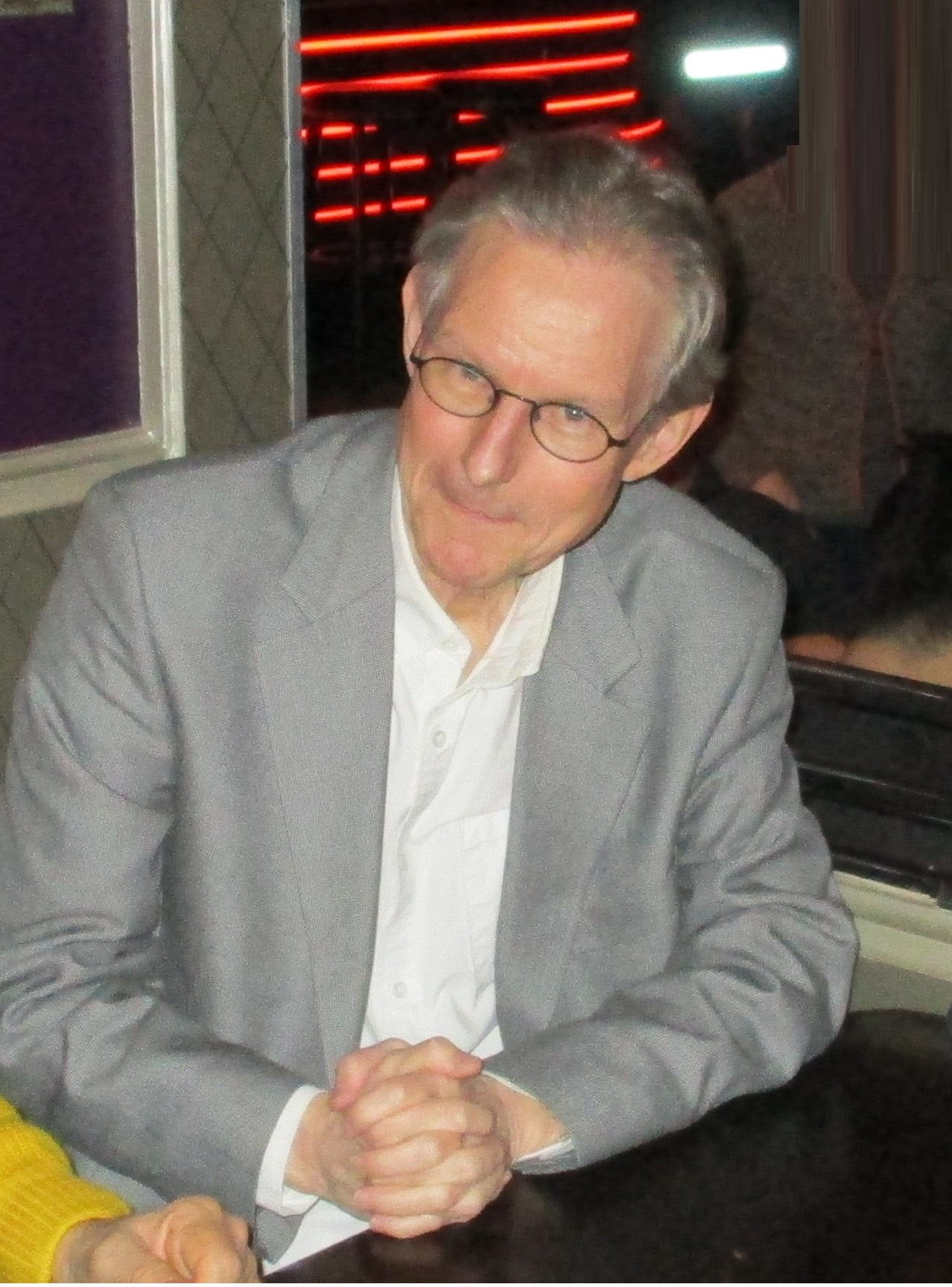
Sundberg in Stockholm in 2018

Ulf Eskil Erik Sundberg (born 29 September 1956) is a Swedish economist, historian and author of books and magazine articles.

Sundberg was born in Stockholm, graduated Studentexamen from Whitlockska in 1976, and earned a Master of Philosophy degree in 2014. He was awarded a Doctor of Philosophy degree from Åbo Akademi University in 2018, with a thesis addressing the loss of the Swedish Empire in the early 18th century. In his thesis, Sundberg is especially critical about the inadequate circumstances under which the country's many outlying fortifications were positioned and maintained, as well as about the planning, construction and remodeling of them by Erik Dahlberg under King Carl XI.

Earlier, he has primarily treated the centuries of warfare in which Sweden and neighboring countries were involved. On a broader field, one of his more noted books is also about the families and relatives of Swedish royalty, including mistresses and extramarital offspring.

== Bibliography ==
- Ulf Sundberg: Svenska freder och stillestånd 1249-1814, Arete Hargshamn 1997 ISBN 9189080017 (in Swedish)
- Ulf Sundberg: Svenska krig 1521-1814, Hjalmarson & Högberg bokförlag, Stockholm 1998 ISBN 9189080149 (in Swedish)
- Ulf Sundberg: Medeltidens svenska krig, Hjalmarson & Högberg, Stockholm 1999 ISBN 9189080262 (in Swedish)
- Ulf Sundberg: Kungliga släktband : kungar, drottningar, frillor och deras barn, Historiska media, Lund 2004 ISBN 9185057487 (in Swedish)
- Ulf Sundberg reviewed by Dick Harrison & Hans Gillingstam: Stockholms blodbad, Historiska media, Lund 2004, ISBN 9185377031 (in Swedish)
- Ulf Sundberg: A short guide to British battleships in World War II, Sundberg & Co, Stockholm 2008 ISBN 9789163321443 (in English)
- Ulf Sundberg: Kraftsamling i Gustav III:s krig 1788-1790, Ancile Design, Kristinehamn 2013 ISBN 9789198119107 (in Swedish)
- Ulf Sundberg: Utkast till svenska historieverk : Ericus Olai - 2008, Ancile Design, Kristinehamn 2014 ISBN 9789198119114 (in Swedish)
- Ulf Sundberg: Swedish defensive fortress warfare in the Great Northern War 1702-1710, Åbo Akademi University Press, Turku 2018 ISBN 9789517658973 (in English)
- Ulf Sundberg (preface): Demitz, Jacob Truedson. Centuries of Selfies Vulkan, Stockholm 2020 ISBN 9789189179639 (in English and Swedish)
