= Eskilstuna-Kuriren =

Newspaper in Eskilstuna, Sweden

Eskilstuna-Kuriren (lit. 'the Eskilstuna Courier') is a Swedish regional newspaper, based in the city of Eskilstuna, with a local office in nearby Strängnäs. It is the largest regional newspaper in the Södermanland region.

== History ==
The first edition of Eskilstuna-Kuriren was published on 8 December 1890. It celebrated 125 years in December 2015. The paper is currently published in Berliner format, and has been published six days a week since 1915.

Since the start, the paper's political position has always been liberal, with longstanding close but informal links to the Swedish Liberal Party. The editorial page was supportive of campaigns for free speech, workers' rights to unionize, male-female equality, and universal suffrage. During the 20th century, its editorials argued for free-market economic principles, typically in opposition to successive Social Democrat governments, and for restrictive policies on alcohol sales, generous foreign aid, and nonrestrictive migration policies. It took a highly critical view of totalitarian ideologies, including Communism and Fascism.

During the Second World War, longtime editor in chief J. A. Selander's strong anti-Nazi stance brought the paper into conflict with Swedish coalition government policy of the time, which sought to appease Berlin to avoid a German invasion. Newspaper issues were repeatedly confiscated by the authorities, and Selander was put on trial, but acquitted. In modern times, Selander has had a street named after him in Eskilstuna. A statue by artist Richard Brixel has been erected near the Eskilstuna-Kuriren building.

In 2015, a Russian government report accused Eskilstuna-Kuriren of unprecedentedly "aggressive" negative coverage of Russia. Editor in chief Eva Burman linked the accusation to the fact that the paper had investigated a Swedish far-right group involved in systematic harassment of journalists and politicians, which, according to a previous investigation by Dagens Nyheter, had financial links to Russian and Ukrainian businessmen.

== Eskilstuna-Kuriren and Folket ==
The historical rival of Eskilstuna-Kuriren in Eskilstuna was Folket, created in 1905 as a split from Eskilstuna-Kuriren. The two papers represented rival political tendencies, with Eskilstuna-Kuriren promoting liberal politics and Folket being linked to the Swedish Social Democratic Party.

Folket suffered a steady decline from the mid-1980s: "For one hundred years, the newspapers carried on a local struggle, but over time it became increasingly unequal," noted a 2006 Swedish government investigation of the situation for print media in the country. By 2002, the difference was stark: Eskilstuna-Kuriren was published in 32,200 copies daily, while Folket had declined to 7,500 copies and was no longer financially viable as an independent paper.

Eskilstuna-Kuriren AB consequently bought 95 percent of Folket in 2003, acquiring the last remaining ownership shares in its former rival in 2011. Despite being purchased by its rival, Folket continued to be published an editorially independent, social-democratic daily until 2012, when it was reduced to a weekly. It carried on in this form for some time, but finally ceased publication in 2015, after 110 years of independent existence, with a print run of less than 3000 and only three remaining employees.

== Expansion, acquisitions, and sale ==
The company Eskilstuna-Kuriren AB is owned by a foundation, Eskilstuna-Kurirens stiftelse, founded in 1940, whose purpose is to "safeguard Eskilstuna-Kuriren in perpetuity as an independent organ of national, spiritual, and personal freedom in accordance with the ideas of liberalism."

In 1955, Eskilstuna-Kuriren AB acquired Strengnäs Tidning, a competitor liberal daily that had been published in Strängnäs since 1845. Ever since, it has been published under the name Strengnäs Tidning in that city, but the two editions differ only slightly beyond the front page. Today, the editions are largely identical but retain separate frontpages and some unique local content.

In 1965, another regional liberal newspaper, Katrineholms-Kuriren, in Katrineholm, was bought by Eskilstuna-Kuriren. In 2003, it acquired its traditional social-democratic rival in Eskilstuna, Folket (see above), and in 2007, Södermanlands Nyheter (in Nyköping). Eskilstuna-Kuriren also acquired a minority share in Mittmedia AB, a major publisher of regional dailies in Sweden, in the mid-2000s. In 2014, the paper founded the company Sörmlands Media to control its publications.

Despite the preceding years of expansion, the paper suffered from the structural transformation of the news market, leading to declining subscription rates and cutbacks. In 2018, Sörmlands Media was sold to Norrköpings Tidningar Media AB (NTM), a major publisher of Swedish regional dailies, in which Eskilstuna-Kuriren AB then acquired a significant minority share.

Eskilstuna-Kuriren's printing house, Eskilstuna-Kurirens tryckeri AB (Ektab), was included in the deal along with a printing house in Nyköping acquired with Södermanlands Nyheter.

== Eskilstuna-Kuriren today ==
In 2018, the combined print run of the editions in Eskilstuna (Eskilstuna-Kuriren) and Strängnäs (Strengnäs Tidning) reached 23 800 copies.

The editor in chief and publisher ("ansvarig utgivare") is Ulrika Sjöblom.
