= Trelleborgs Allehanda =

Regional newspaper in Sweden

- Format: Daily newspaper
- Owner: Gota Media
- Founded: 1876; 149 years ago
- Language: Swedish
- Headquarters: Trelleborg
- Country: Sweden
- ISSN: 1104-0114
- OCLC number: 940608142
- Website: Trelleborgs Allehanda

Trelleborgs Allehanda is a regional daily newspaper based in Trelleborg, Sweden. The paper was launched in 1876. It was previously owned by media publishing group Bonnier AB. In 2011 the paper became part of Gota Media together with Kristianstadsbladet and Ystads Allehanda. The co-owner is the Stiftelsen Kristianstadpress Foundation.

In 2010 Trelleborgs Allehanda won the award of excellence in the Society for News Design competition for its redesign of the supplement entitled ZickZack.

The Swedish author and journalist Pascal Engman is one of the newspaper's former staff reporters.
