= Upplands-Folket =

Upplands-Folket was a communist weekly newspaper published in Uppsala, Sweden from March 1945 to December 1949. It had a weekly edition of around 3998 in 1946, 3800 in 1947 and 2900 in 1949.

Upplandsfolket was released as a public magazine in 2001, by its owner Left party in Uppsala county. The pdf-version could be read at Go to the meny "Artikelarkiv" on that side choose "Upplandsfolket arkiv" and "Visa". Its edition is a meagre 300 to 500 copies in print. Before going public again the papers name was used for an internal newsbulletin for members of the Leftparty.
