= Nya Folkviljan =

Nya Folkviljan ('New Popular Will') was a socialist weekly newspaper published in southern Sweden 1906-1920. It was founded in Helsingborg, but shifted to Malmö in 1907. The paper became associated with Ungsocialisterna.

In the period 1906-1912 the weekly editions of the paper were between 12-16000. In 1920, the weekly edition was 1500.

1917-1920 the full title of the paper was "Nya Folkviljan - organ for anti-Christian and revolutionary socialist propaganda.
