= Norrköpings Tidningar =

Daily newspaper in Sweden

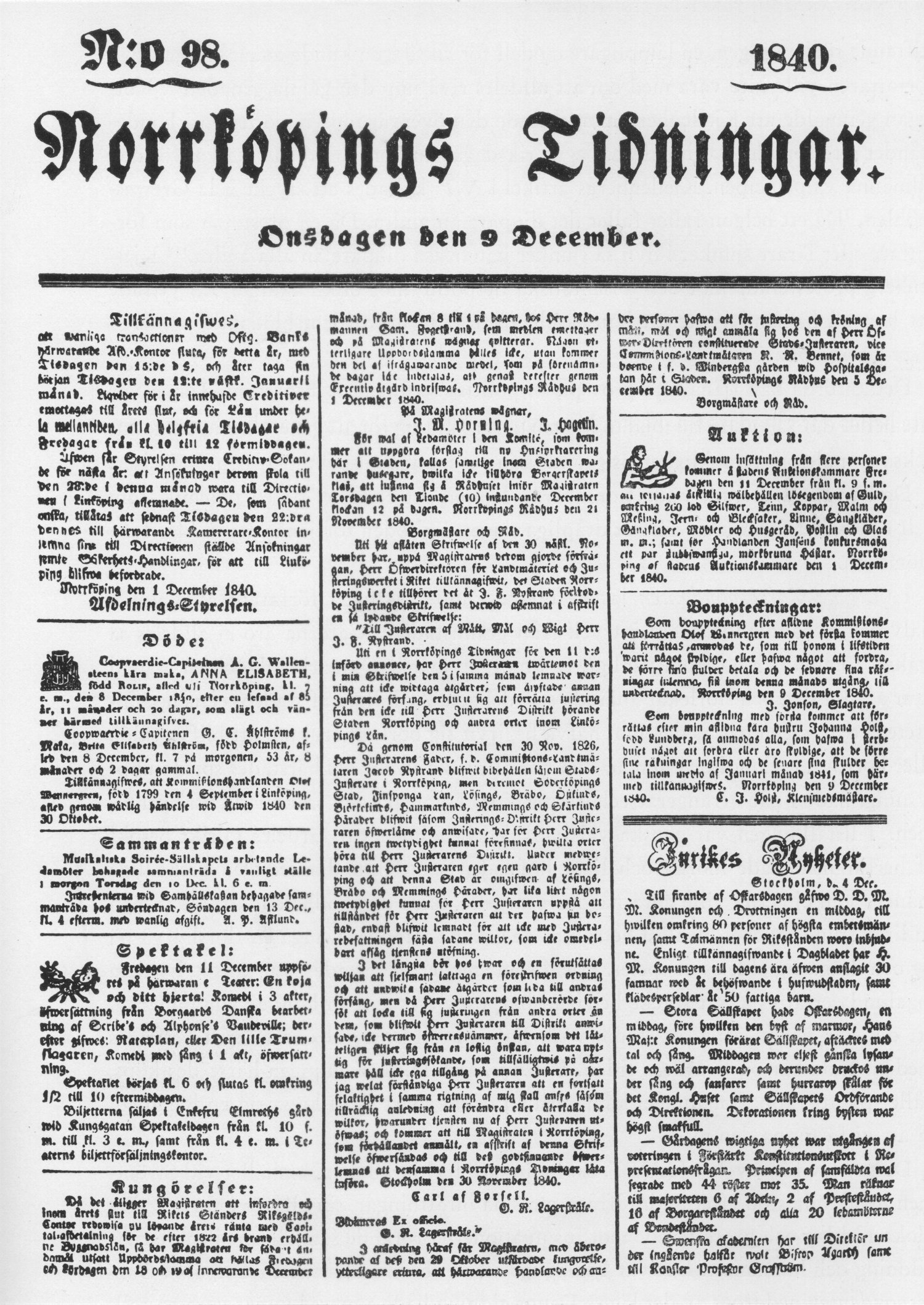
- The front page of Norrköpings Tidningar on 9 December 1840
- Type: Daily newspaper
- Format: Tabloid
- Owner(s): Erik and Asta Sundin Foundation
- Publisher: Norrköping Tidningar AB
- Editor-in-chief: Anders Nilsson
- Founded: 14 October 1758
- Political alignment: Moderate
- Language: Swedish
- Circulation: 37,500 (2013)
- ISSN: 1103-9779
- OCLC number: 477955251
- Website: nt.se

Norrköpings Tidningar (English: Norrköping Times), also known as NT, is a Swedish language daily newspaper with its main distribution in northern and eastern Östergötland, Sweden.

== History and profile ==
The newspaper was founded in 1758 as the Norrköping Weko-Tidningar, and published its first issue on 14 October of that year. Norrköpings Tidningar is Sweden's oldest continually published newspaper still in print, and has published six days a week since 1871. The paper's principal owner is the Erik and Asta Sundin Foundation, named after Erik Sundin, who served as editor-in-chief of the paper from 1899 until 1929, and his widow, Asta Sundin. The foundation has owned the paper since 1947.

The newspaper was first published on 14 October 1758, after county Governor Gustaf Adolf Lagerfelt sent an application to the Office of His Majesty, which issued the privilege on 15 September 1758. In 1959, the evening Östergötlands Dagblad was acquired and combined. In 1967, circulation exceeded 50,000 copies for the first time. The newspaper attempted to expand into southern Södermanland, establishing a local office in Katrineholm and publishing a special local edition. However, publication in Södermanland ceased the next year due to costs and a low subscription rate.

Norrköpings Tidningar aligns with the Moderate Party, and is published by Norrköping Tidningar AB, majority owner of Norrköpings Tidningars Media AB, which also publishes several other newspapers including Folkbladet, Gotlands Allehanda, Gotlands Tidningar, Västerviks-Tidningen and Norrländska Socialdemokraten and operates the local television stations 24nt, 24Corren and 24Norrbotten and five local radio stations. The company acquired Gotlands Allehanda and Gotlands Tidningar in 1999. It also bought Folkbladet, which is based in Östergötland, in 2000. In 2002 Norrbottens-Kuriren, newspaper based in Luleå, was acquired by the company.

== Circulation ==
The circulation of Norrköpings Tidningar was 49,400 copies in 2002. In 2007 its circulation was approximately 49,000 copies per day. The paper had a circulation of 39,500 copies in 2012 and 37,500 copies in 2013.
