= Skånes köpmannablad =

Skånes köpmannablad ('Merchants Newspaper of Skåne') was a weekly newspaper published in Malmö, Sweden, between 1919 (107 years ago) and 1935 (91 years ago).

The newspaper was the organ of the Merchants League of Skåne. Albin Bolmstedt was the editor of the publication from 1920 to 1935. The newspaper was closed down as Bolmstedt launched a new publication in 1936, Handelsbladet.
