= Faktum =

Street newspaper

- June 2009 issue
- Editor in Chief: Malin Kling
- Frequency: Monthly
- Circulation: 20 000
- First issue: 2001
- Country: Sweden
- Based in: Gothenburg
- Language: Swedish
- Website: http://www.faktum.nu/
- ISSN: 1650-948X

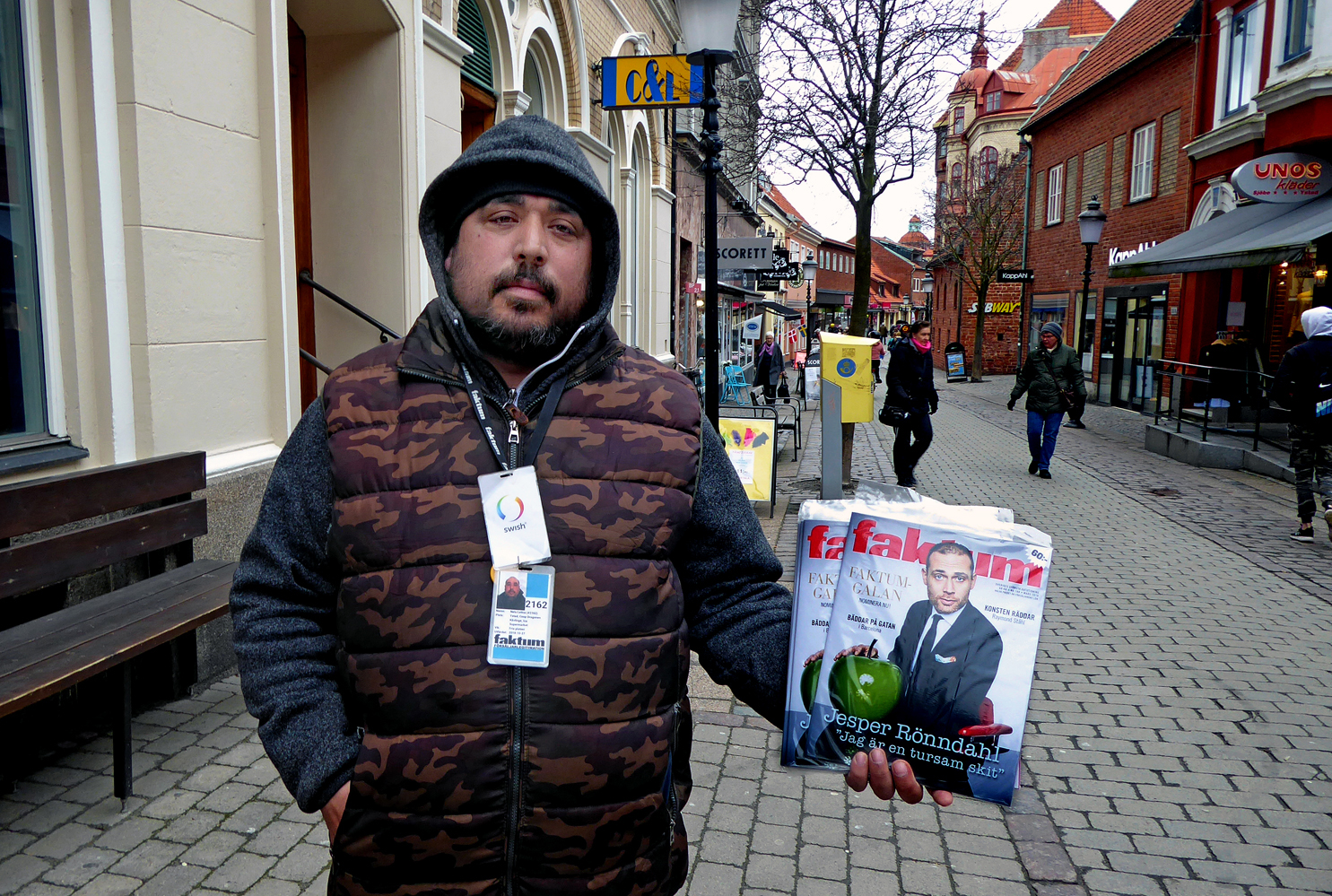
Street newspaper vendor in Ystad 2019.

Faktum is a street newspaper sold by homeless people in Gothenburg, and other cities in southern Sweden. It is the equivalent of Situation Sthlm in Stockholm, Aluma in Malmö, Lund and Helsingborg, and The Big Issue in English-speaking countries.

The paper was founded in 2001.

In 2006 it was awarded the grand prize of the Swedish Publicists' Association (Publicistklubben) together with its sister papers Situation Sthlm and Aluma.

== See also ==
- List of street newspapers
- Homelessness in Sweden
