= Situation Sthlm =

Street newspaper in Stockholm, Sweden

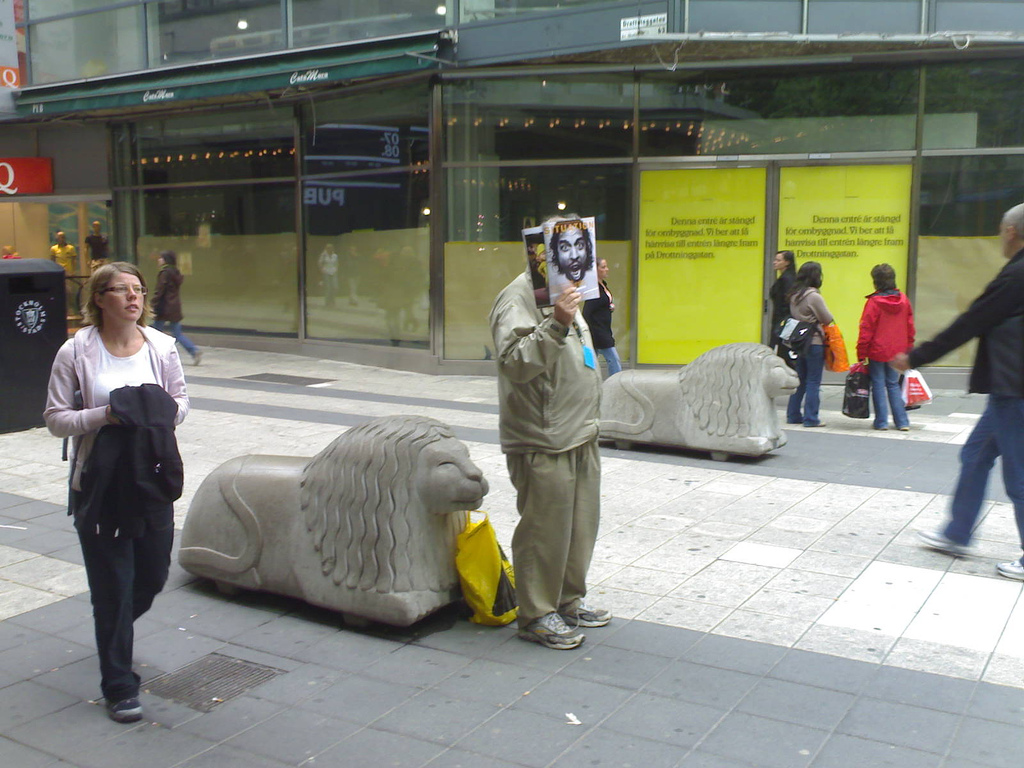
Situation Sthlm vendor

Situation Sthlm is a street newspaper sold by homeless people in Stockholm, Sweden. It was founded in 1995, and was Sweden's only street newspaper until Faktum and Aluma were founded early in the 2000s.

In 2006 it was awarded the grand prize of Publicistklubben (Swedish Publicists' Association) together with its sister papers Faktum and Aluma.
