= Haparandabladet =

Regional newspaper for Tornedalen, Sweden

- Founded: 5 July 1882; 143 years ago
- Language: Swedish; Finnish; Meänkieli
- Country: Sweden
- Website: haparandabladet.se

Haparandabladet (Finnish: Haaparannanlehti) is a Swedish regional newspaper for Tornedalen. It began as two separate newspapers — one Finnish and one Swedish — but the two merged in 1923 to produce one bilingual publication. In 2015, they also began publishing in Meänkieli.

== History ==
The first issue, then a solely Finnish publication, was published on 5 July 1882. It merged with its sister Swedish paper in 1923.

As of 1894, the Swedish paper was published on Saturdays while the Finnish paper was published on Wednesdays. Printer F.E. Nikander took over the paper's publication in 1896. As of 1929, it was Sweden's only Finnish-language newspaper. It was described as the only bilingual paper in 1952, when it celebrated its seventieth anniversary. They received 400,000 SEK of press support in 1979. In 1984, they declared bankruptcy and changed ownership, as well as political alignment — from moderate to right-wing.

Örjan Pekka became editor-in-chief in 1997. He also assumed ownership of the newspaper, which continued after Axel Andén took over as editor-in-chief on 1 November 2019. Andén left Haparandabladet for Journalisten in 2023.

In 2015, the paper also began publishing in Meänkieli, with author Bengt Pohjanen serving as translator.
