= Skaraborgs Allehanda =

Swedish newspaper

Skaraborgs Allehanda is a daily newspaper published in Skövde since 1884. The paper's political bent had shifted over the decades; it currently leans towards a moderately conservative position. It was a 2, 3, or 4-day paper alternately until 1968, until it became a daily publication. It has a circulation of around 25,000. It is published in tabloid format.
