= Syd-Österbotten =

- Owner: HSS Media
- Editor: Mats Ekman
- Founded: 1903
- Language: Swedish
- Headquarters: Närpes, Finland
- Website: sydin.fi

Syd-Österbotten ("South Ostrobothnia") is a Swedish-language newspaper published in Närpes and Kristinestad in Finland. It is owned by HSS Media and is published three times a week.

The history of the newspaper goes back to 1897 when Kristinestads Tidning was founded. After the closure of Kristinestads Tidning by the Russian authorities in 1900, the new newspaper Syd-Österbotten was founded in 1903.

The current editor of Syd-Österbotten is Mats Ekman.
