= Upsala Nya Tidning =

Swedish daily newspaper

- Type: Daily newspaper
- Format: Tabloid
- Owner(s): Norrköping Tidningar AB
- Editor-in-chief: Charlotta Friborg
- Founded: 1890; 135 years ago
- Language: Swedish
- Headquarters: Uppsala, Sweden
- Circulation: 45,600 (2013)
- ISSN: 1104-0173
- Website: www.unt.se

Upsala Nya Tidning or UNT (meaning Upsala New Newspaper in English) is a regional daily newspaper published in Uppsala (archaically spelled Upsala), Sweden.

== History and profile ==
Upsala Nya Tidning was established in 1890. The distribution and news coverage are mainly regional, while the editorial page is devoted to national and international as well as regional affairs. The stated political position of the editorial page is "independent liberal". The paper was published in broadsheet format until 1 February 2005 when it began to be published in tabloid format.

Upsala Nya Tidning was owned by the Uppsala Nya Tidning AB until 2009 when it was acquired by the Norrköpings Tidningar AB.

== Circulation ==
Upsala Nya Tidning had a circulation of 62,800 copies in 2003. It was 49,900 copies in 2010. The circulation of the paper was 47,700 copies in 2012 and 45,600 copies in 2013.

== See also ==
- List of Swedish newspapers
