= Gotlands Tidningar =

Swedish local newspaper

- Type: Local newspaper
- Format: Tabloid
- Owner(s): Norrköpings Tidningar Media AB
- Publisher: Gotlands Förenade Tidningstryckerier
- Founded: 1966
- Language: Swedish
- Headquarters: Visby
- Country: Sweden
- Sister newspapers: Gotlands Allehanda
- Website: Gotlands Tidningar

Gotlands Tidningar (Swedish: Gotland’s Newspapers) is a local newspaper based in Visby, Sweden.

== Profile ==
Gotlands Tidningar was established in 1966 when two papers, Gotlänningen and Gotlands Folkblad, formed a joint operating company to publish them as two editions under the same name. The paper has its headquarters in Visby and is published six days per week. Since 1999 the paper has been owned by Norrköpings Tidningar Media AB. The publisher is Gotlands Förenade Tidningstryckerier. The paper is published in tabloid format.

In 2002 Gotlands Tidningar sold 12,800 copies. The circulation of the paper was 12,100 copies in 2010.
