= Kristianstadsbladet =

Swedish regional newspaper

- Type: Daily newspaper
- Format: Tabloid
- Owner(s): Gota Media
- Founded: 1856
- Political alignment: Liberal
- Language: Swedish
- Headquarters: Kristianstad
- ISSN: 1103-9523
- OCLC number: 482018193
- Website: Kristianstadsbladet

Kristianstadsbladet is a regional newspaper published in Kristianstad, Sweden, which has been in circulation since 1856.

== History and profile ==
The paper was established in 1856. It is published daily except for holidays. It has a liberal political stance.

The owner of Kristianstadsbladet was Bonnier Group until 2011 when it was acquired by Gota Media together with Trelleborgs Allehanda and Ystads Allehanda. The paper was published by Sydsvenska Dagbladet AB under Bonnier Group. It was previously published in broadsheet format, but later its format was converted into tabloid format.

In 2011 Kristianstadsbladet was the recipient of Society for News Design Award of Excellence.
