= Västernorrlands Allehanda =

Swedish newspaper

Västernorrlands Allehanda was a daily newspaper published in Sweden in the city of Härnösand. It was founded in 1874, with 4-day publishing beginning in 1884, and daily publication starting in 1894. The publication was sold to MIttMedia in 1997, and merged with Nya Norrland in 2000. It was founded by Johan Olof Nyberg. In 1964 the paper adopted a tabloid formatting. Roughly until the time of its merger, it had the widest circulation of all papers in Ångermanland.
