= Flamman =

Swedish left-wing newspaper

- Type: Weekly newspaper
- Owner: Tidningsföreningen Norrskensflamman
- Editor-in-chief: Leonidas Aretakis
- Founded: 1906
- Political alignment: Independent socialist
- Language: Swedish
- Headquarters: Stockholm
- Circulation: 5,000
- ISSN: 1403-7424
- Website: www.flamman.se

Flamman (lit. 'the flame') is a Swedish socialist weekly magazine based in Stockholm.

The magazine was founded in 1906 as a daily newspaper aligned with the Social Democrats, and was based in the northern Norrbotten region until 1987. Since the 1990s, Flamman is a weekly independent magazine without attachment to any political parties.

The original name of the magazine was Norrskensflamman (lit. 'the flame of northern lights'), which was shortened in 1998.

== History and profile ==
Flamman was founded in 1906 by the workers in Malmfälten and was the regional newspaper of the Swedish Social Democratic Workers' Party. The circulation of the paper reached its peak in the 1920s, with 11,000 daily copies.

After the Social Democratic Party was divided in 1917, the newspaper became a regional organ of the Swedish Social Democratic Left Party (SSV) in Norrbotten County, and later the Swedish Communist Party (SKP). When the Communist Party split in 1977, the newspaper became the voice for the Workers Party - The Communists (APK). In 1989, it changed from being a daily to a weekly newspaper. In 1990, the newspaper broke with APK and became an independent socialist weekly.

Since 1987, Flamman is based in Stockholm. The current editor Leonidas Aretakis was appointed in 2021.

== The 1940 arson attack ==
On the night of 3 March 1940, an arson attack was made against the offices of Norrskensflamman in Luleå. The attack was the biggest political attack during the 1900s and considered a terrorist attack. Five persons were killed, including two children, and another five persons were injured. The newspaper's offices were completely destroyed. It was carried out by Ebbe Hallberg, Uno Svanbom, a military captain, three other officers, as well as Gunnar Hedenström, a journalist from the right-wing newspaper, Norrbottens-Kuriren. The attack was planned in the offices of Norrbottens-Kuriren.

The arson attack had financial support from Andreas Lindblom, manager of Skansen, and Paul Wretlind, chairman of the Stockholm section of the Liberal People's Party.
