= Gotlands Allehanda =

Local newspaper in Falu, Sweden

- Type: Local newspaper
- Format: Tabloid
- Owner(s): Norrköpings Tidningar Media AB
- Publisher: Gotlands Förenade Tidningstryckerier
- Founded: 1873
- Language: Swedish
- Headquarters: Visby
- Country: Sweden
- Sister newspapers: Gotlands Tidningar
- ISSN: 1103-9310
- Website: Gotlands Allehanda

Gotlands Allehanda is a Swedish local newspaper based in Visby, Sweden. It has been in circulation since 1873.

== History and profile ==
Gotlands Allehanda was founded in 1873. The headquarters is in Visby and is published six days per week. Since 1999 the paper has been owned by Norrköpings Tidningar Media AB. The publisher is Gotlands Förenade Tidningstryckerier. The paper is published in tabloid format. It has a conservative political stance.

In 2002 Gotlands Allehanda sold 10,800 copies. The circulation of the paper was 9,200 in 2010.
