= Sydsvenskan =

Swedish daily newspaper

Sydsvenska Dagbladet Snällposten

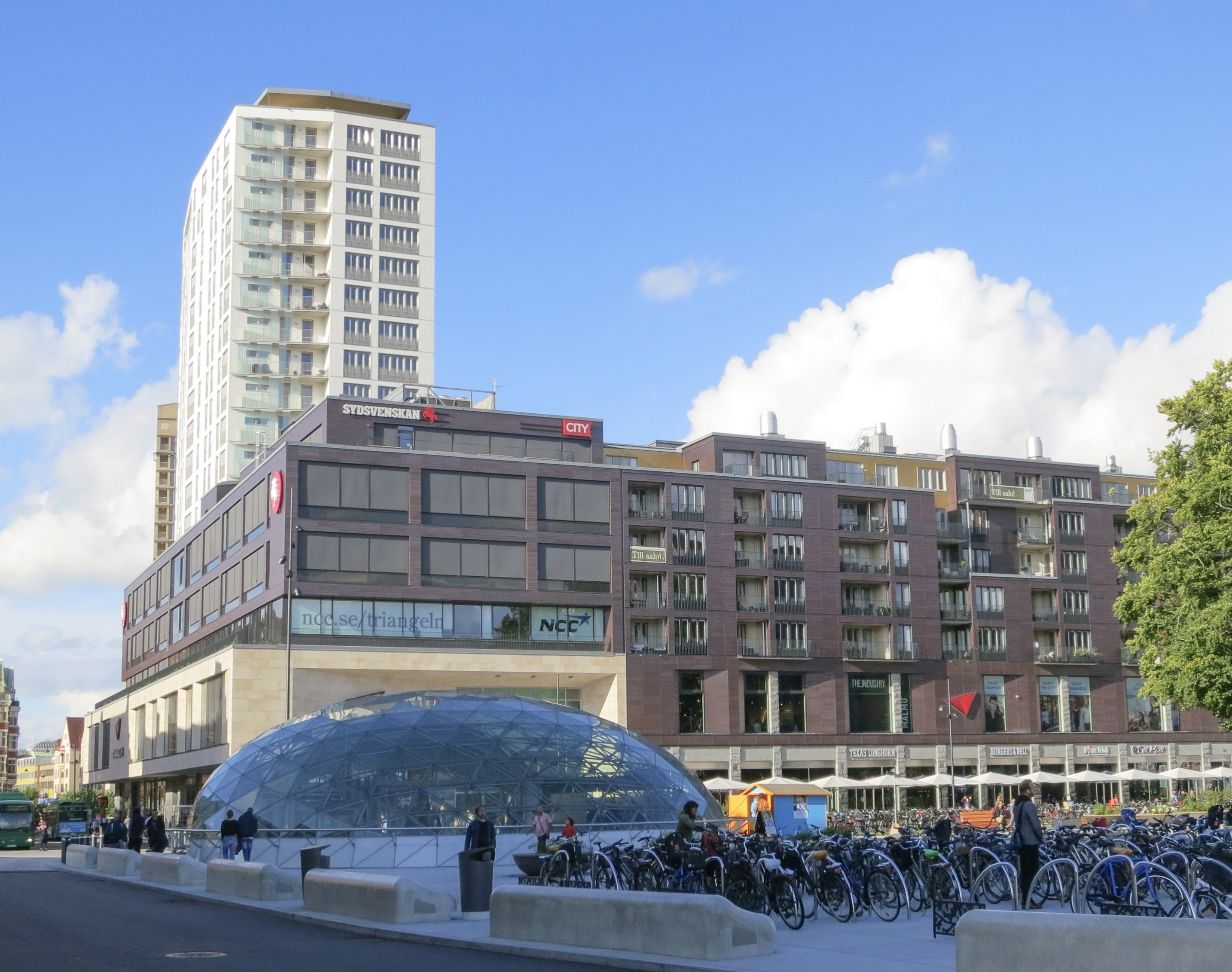
- Sydsvenskans headquarters in Malmö.
- Type: Daily newspaper
- Format: Compact
- Owner: Bonnier Group
- Editor-in-chief: Pia Rehnquist
- Founded: 1870; 156 years ago
- Language: Swedish
- Headquarters: Malmö, Sweden
- Circulation: 99,800 (2013)
- ISSN: 1652-814X
- Website: www.sydsvenskan.se

Sydsvenska Dagbladet Snällposten, generally known simply as Sydsvenskan (Swedish pronunciation: [ˈsŷːdˌsvɛnːskan], lit. 'the South Swedish'), is a daily newspaper published in Scania in Sweden.

== History and profile ==
Sydsvenskan was founded in 1870. In 1871 the paper merged with Snällposten which was started in 1848. Sydsvenskan is headquartered in Malmö and mostly distributed in southern Scania. Its coverage is characterized by local news from southwest Scania in addition to a full coverage of national, EU, and international news. The paper is owned by the Bonnier Group which bought it in 1994.

It was one of the Swedish publications which featured news materials provided by the Swedish Intelligence Agency during World War II. Until 1966, Sydsvenskan had close ties to the Rightist Party (now Moderate Party). In the Swedish debate about the country's role in the EU and in relation to the Eurozone, the paper has emphasized the importance of a closer political, economical, and cultural affiliation to Europe. Its stated editorial position is "independent liberal".

The newspaper changed its format from broadsheet to compact format on 5 October 2004.

=== Paywall Policy Changes ===
Sydsvenskan introduced a soft paywall in February 2013 limiting non-subscribers to a maximum of 20 free articles per month. In 2014, this was changed to 5 articles per week. Subscription models were available from 28 Swedish kronor, with the cheapest one giving full access to the website. In August 2014, this increased to 59 Swedish kronor (around US$7.10), as the former price was an introductory price. A year after the introduction of the paywall, 60,000 subscribers had created accounts on the website and 4,000 had purchased a digital subscription.

In January 2016, Sydsvenskan removed the paywall, with the editor-in-chief Pia Rehnquist saying that having a paywall had led to a general belief that you had to pay to read the website. She also said that the digital aspect had gone well, but the newspaper thought it would be better to reach more readers.

However, as of May 2026, Sydsvenskan is entirely paywalled. As of May 2026, subscriptions can be purchased at an introductory price of 9 Swedish krona (approximately $0.98 USD as of May 2026) for the first two months and 249 Swedish krona (approximately $26.98 USD as of May 2026) per month thereafter.

=== Acquisition of Helsingborgs Dagblad ===
In the end of April 2014, Sydsvenskan acknowledged their intention to buy Helsingborgs Dagblad. A deal was reached in the end of May and the Swedish Competition Authority approved it around two weeks after. A strong reason was reported to be that both newspapers had seen their ad revenue decrease heavily.

== Circulation ==
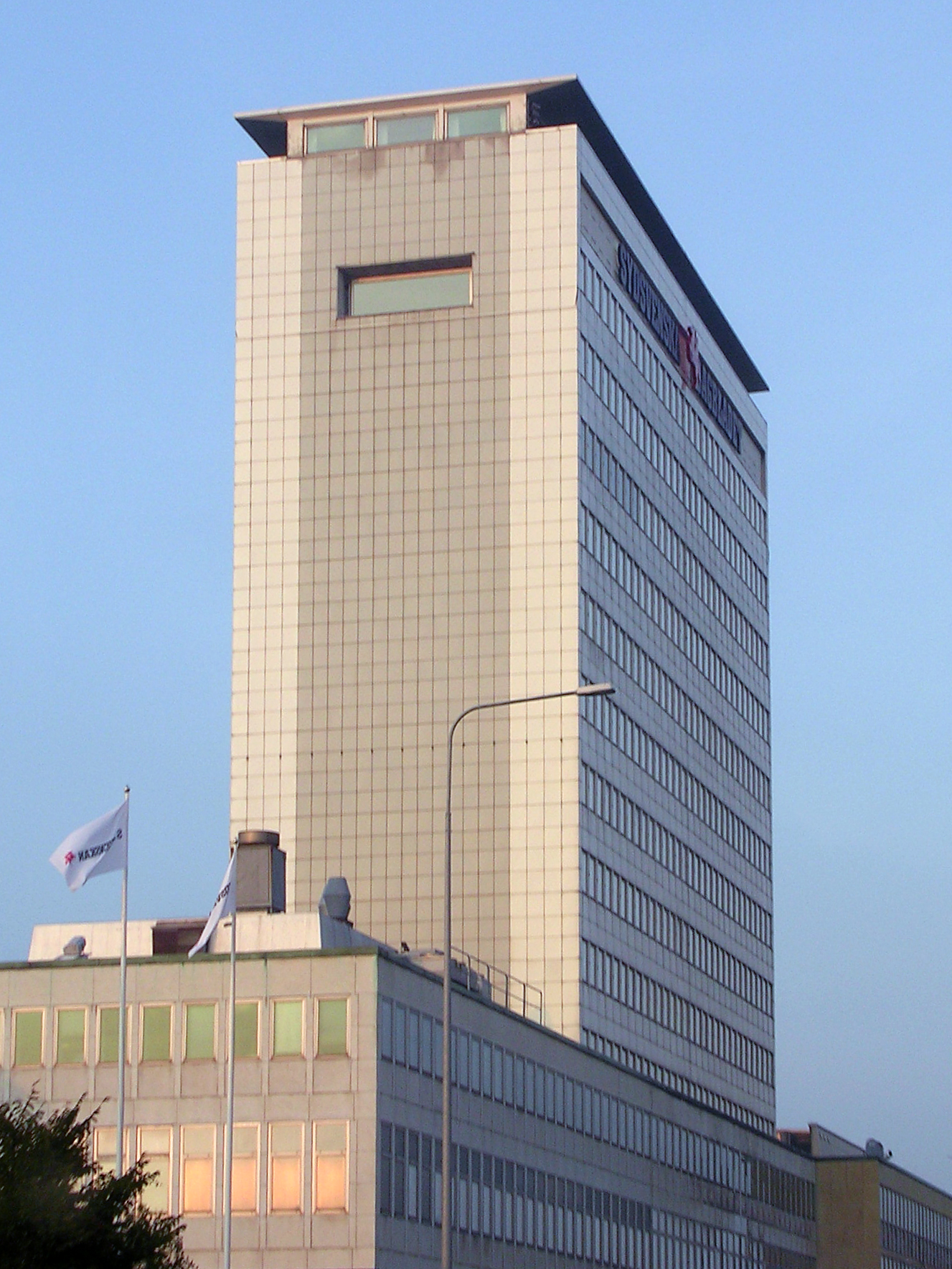
The former main headquarters in Malmö.

In 1998 the circulation of Sydsvenskan was 125,000 copies on weekdays and 146,000 copies on Sundays. The paper had a circulation of 129,300 copies on weekdays in 2005. It was 94,800 copies in 2012. The circulation of the paper was 99,800 copies in 2013.

== See also ==
- List of newspapers in Sweden
