= Södermanlands Nyheter =

Swedish daily newspaper

- Type: Daily newspaper
- Editor-in-chief: Eva Burman
- Founded: 1893
- Language: Swedish
- Headquarters: Nyköping
- ISSN: 1104-0084
- Website: Södermanlands Nyheter

Södermanlands Nyheter is a newspaper published in Nyköping, Sweden, that has been in circulation since 1893.

== History and profile ==
The paper was established in 1893. The headquarters of the paper is in Nyköping, and the parent company is Eskilstuna-Kuriren.

Businessman T. Armas Morby was the owner of the paper between 1956 and February 1973 when the Centre Party acquired it. Following the acquisition of the paper by the Centre Party it became part of the Centertidningar AB, which was acquired by VLT AB in October 2005. The Centre Party continued to appoint the political editors of the paper which became owned by the Stampen and VLT AB following the acquisition.

Eva Burman is the editor-in-chief of Södermanlands Nyheter since 2019.
