= Swedish Publicists' Association =

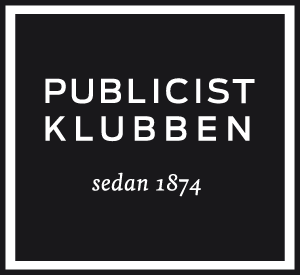

The Swedish Publicists' Association (Swedish: Publicistklubben) is a Swedish organisation devoted to promoting freedom of the press and free speech in journalism.

The Association was founded in Stockholm in 1874 and today it has approximately 5,200 members and seven chapters in different regions of Sweden. It arranges debates on current topics and hands out prizes as well as scholarships, funded by a donation from Lars Johan Hierta.

== Prizes ==
=== Freedom of Speech prize ===
This prize is given in memory of Anna Politkovskaya, the murdered Russian journalist, writer, and human rights activist.

- 2015: Khadija Ismayilova
- 2013: Michail Afanasiev
- 2012: Johan Persson, Jonas Fahlman & Martin Schibbye
- 2011: Fredrik Gertten
- 2010: Amun Abdullahi Mohamed
- 2009: Elin Jönsson
- 2008: Ulf Johansson, editor-in-chief, Nerikes Allehanda newspaper.
- 2007: Dawit Isaak
