= 1975 Båstad protests =

1975 anti-Chilean junta protests in Sweden

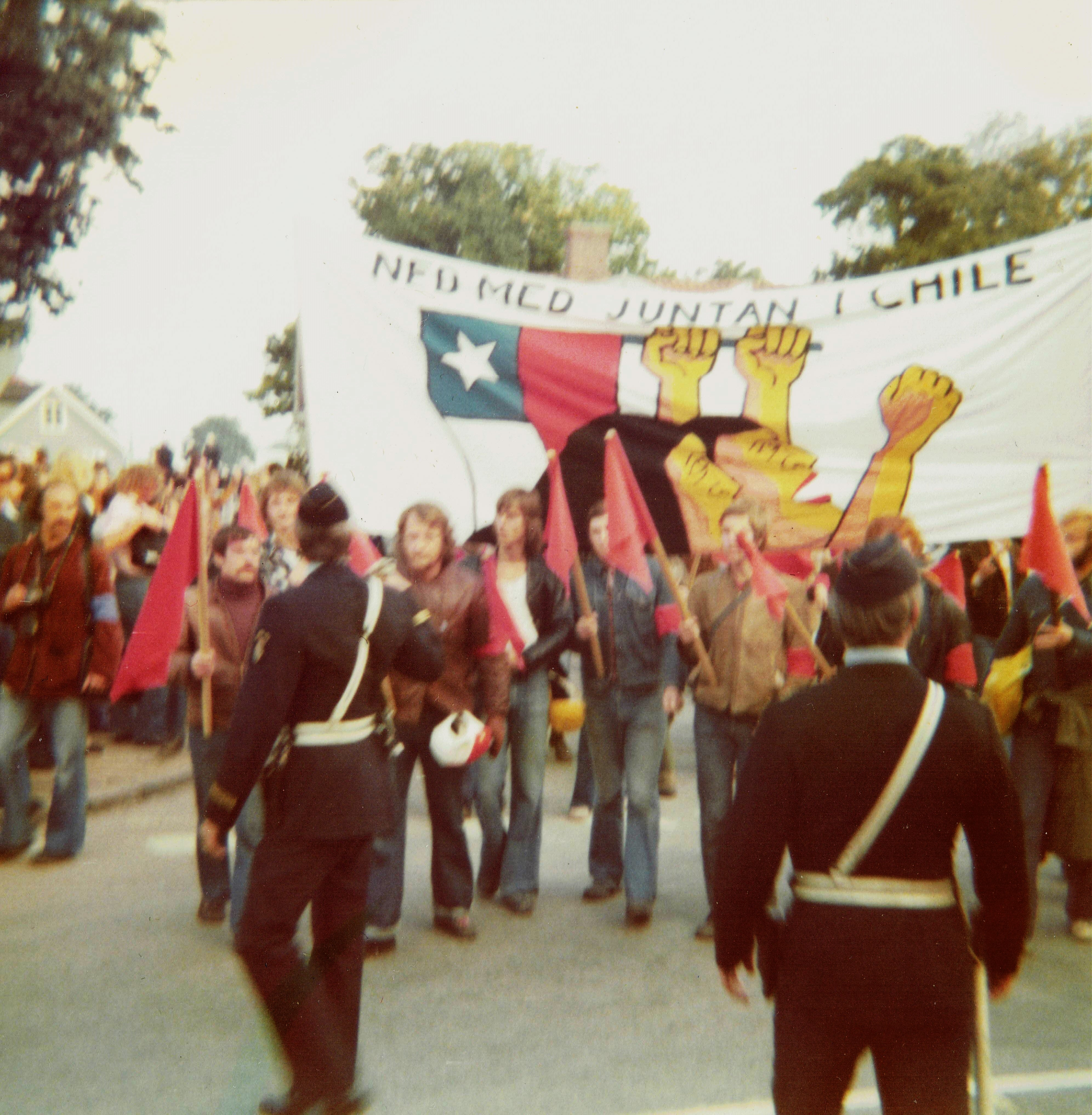
1975 Båstad protest

The 1975 Båstad protests were protests against a Sweden–Chile tennis match played in Båstad as part of the 1975 Davis Cup, organised due to opposition to the Chilean military dictatorship which had taken power two years prior. Learning from the 1968 Båstad riots, police presence was heavy, with little to no violence during the protests and the game being played as planned.

The protests were part of the international campaign against the Pinochet dictatorship, with protests organised by both leftist groups under the Chile Committee and by the Social Democratic Youth League (SSU). Participants included the former prime minister Tage Erlander and future deputy prime minister Lars Engqvist, who both spoke at the SSU protest.

== Background ==
In 1968 anti-apartheid activists protesting against a Sweden–Rhodesia match during the 1968 Davis Cup escalated into riots, preventing the game from being played and forcing a change of venue.

After the 1973 coup, opposition to the Chilean Junta became a major international issue within the Swedish left, and when it became known that Chile would be playing tennis on a Swedish court various groups wanted to show their opposition. The games were to be played 18-20 September 1975.

== Events ==
Fearing a repeat of the riots, the Swedish police presence numbered 1200-1300 officers, of which 43 were mounted.

One day before the game, the SSU organised a protest numbering 3000 participants, including speeches by Tage Erlander and Lars Engqvist. The Social Democrats were formally not opposed to the match being played, but wanted to show their opposition to the Chilean dictatorship. This may have had a calming effect ahead of the match.

Shortly before the game started, Chilean player Jaime Fillol received a death threat, followed by another three Chilean players refusing to play. Chile requested a change of venue to another country but were refused by the International Tennis Federation. A backup team was set to be sent, but Fillol and the other players withdrew their refusal to play before this could be arranged.

On the 20 September, as the doubles matches were set to be played, the left-wing groups organised a protest, led by the Chile Committee. The goal of these protestors was to stop the match from being played, marching under the slogan Stoppa matchen (transl. Stop the match). Ahead of the protest, buses carrying participants arrived in Båstad during the night, estimated at a total of 6000 participants. Police had granted a permit, allowing them to march from Malens Torg to Pershög, but they were not allowed to stop while passing the square, which laid near the centre court. The marchers stopped at the square anyway to chant, using whistling and sirens to make enough noise to be heard at the centre court.

After the march reached its destination, the crowd dissolved in an orderly fashion, and even cleaned up after themselves. No significant violence had occurred.

== In popular culture ==
Swedish band Hoola Bandoola Band wrote and played a song in connection to the protests, titled Stoppa matchen. The match and protests feature in the SVT 'yearbook' documentary Året var 1975.

== See also ==
- Båstad riots
- 2009 Malmö Davis Cup riots
