= Frank Baude =

Swedish politician and bricklayer (1936–2021)

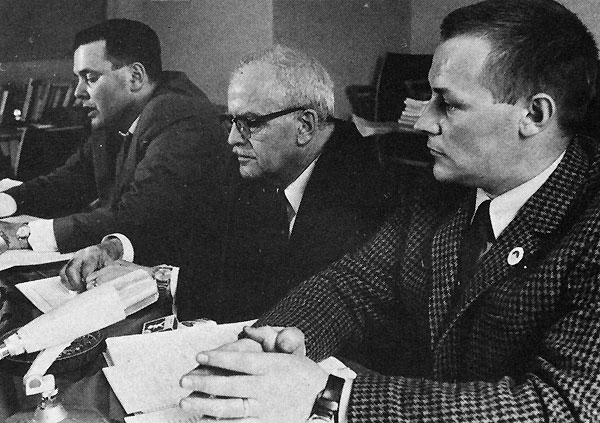
- From left: Bo Gustafsson, Nils Holmberg and Baude at the founding of KFML in 1967.

Chairman of KPML(r)
- In office 1970–1998
- Succeeded by: Anders Carlsson

Personal details
- Born: 16 July 1936 Majorna, Gothenburg, Sweden
- Died: 4 February 2021 (aged 84) Gothenburg
- Party: KPML(r)
- Occupation: Bricklayer

Frank Torvald Baude (6 July 1936 – 4 February 2021) was a Swedish politician and bricklayer who was chairman of the Communist Party Marxist-Leninists (the revolutionaries), KPML(r), from 1970 to 1998.

In April 2014 Baude announced that he was leaving the Communist Party due to having lost trust in both the party leadership and the editorial staff of Proletären, the party's newspaper. His departure was confirmed by then party chairman Robert Mathiasson.

Baude died at Sahlgrenska University Hospital in Gothenburg on 4 February 2021, after suffering a heart attack.
