= RKU =

RKU may refer to:

- Reichskommissariat Ukraine
- Revolutionary Communist Youth (Norway)
- Revolutionary Communist Youth (Sweden)
- Ryutsu Keizai University
