= Anders Carlsson (politician) =

Swedish politician (born 1951)

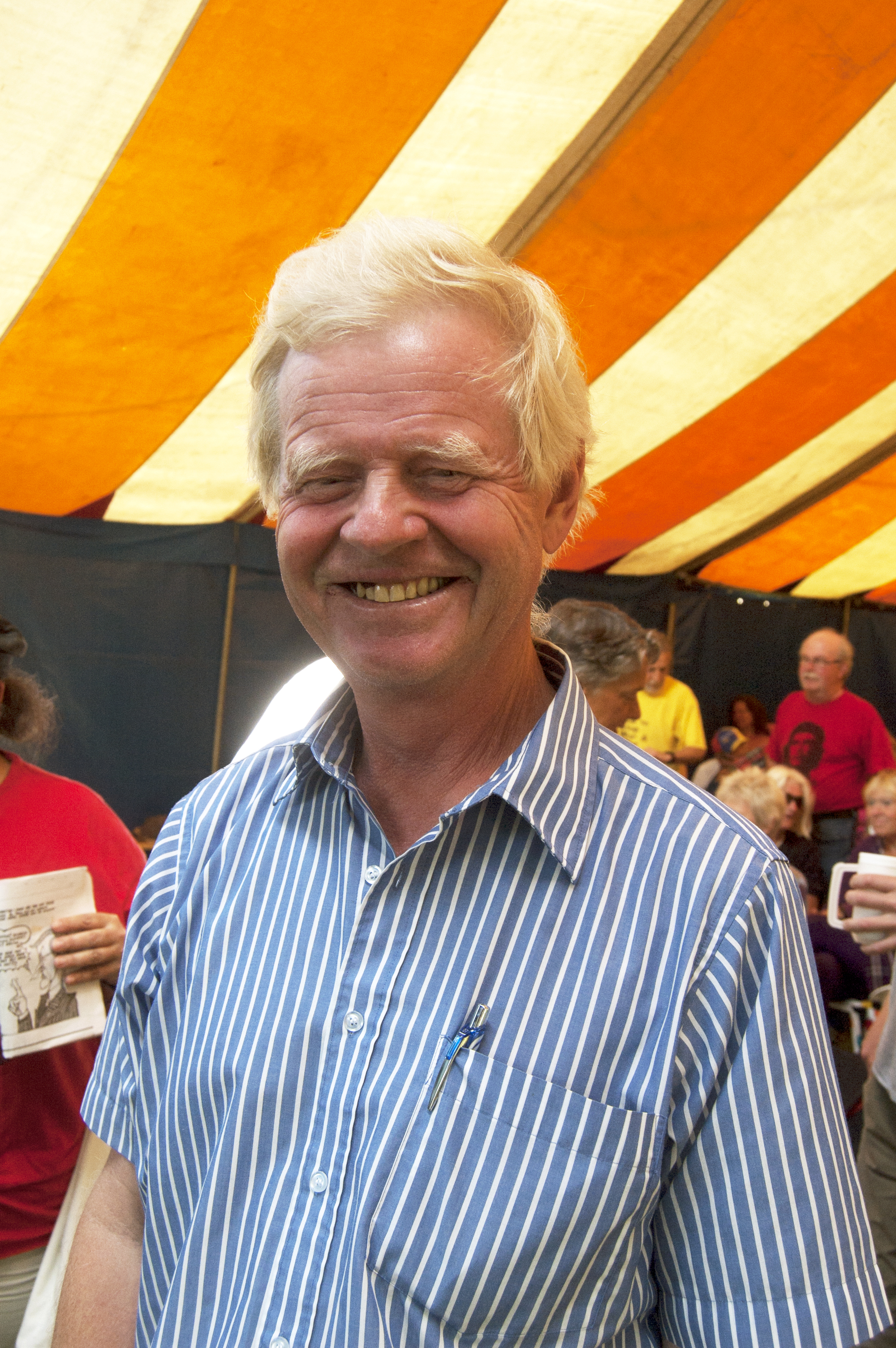

Chairman of the Communist Party
- In office 1999–2014
- Preceded by: Frank Baude
- Succeeded by: Robert Mathiasson

Personal details
- Born: 24 January 1951 (age 75) Hisingen, Gothenburg
- Party: Communist Party

Anders Carlsson (born 24 January 1951) is a Swedish politician and former chairman of the Communist Party from 1999 until 2014. Carlsson's mother was one of Sweden's first kindergarten teachers and his father was a sailor and later on a sea captain.

In 1969 he was elected member of KFML and in 1972 he was employed by the newspaper Proletären. He has been working for the party ever since.

He got his first file in the Swedish Security Service's archive in 1968, after participating in a study circle on Marxism.
