= Järntorgsbrunnen =

Sculpture by Tore Strindberg

Coordinates: 57°41′59″N 11°57′10″E

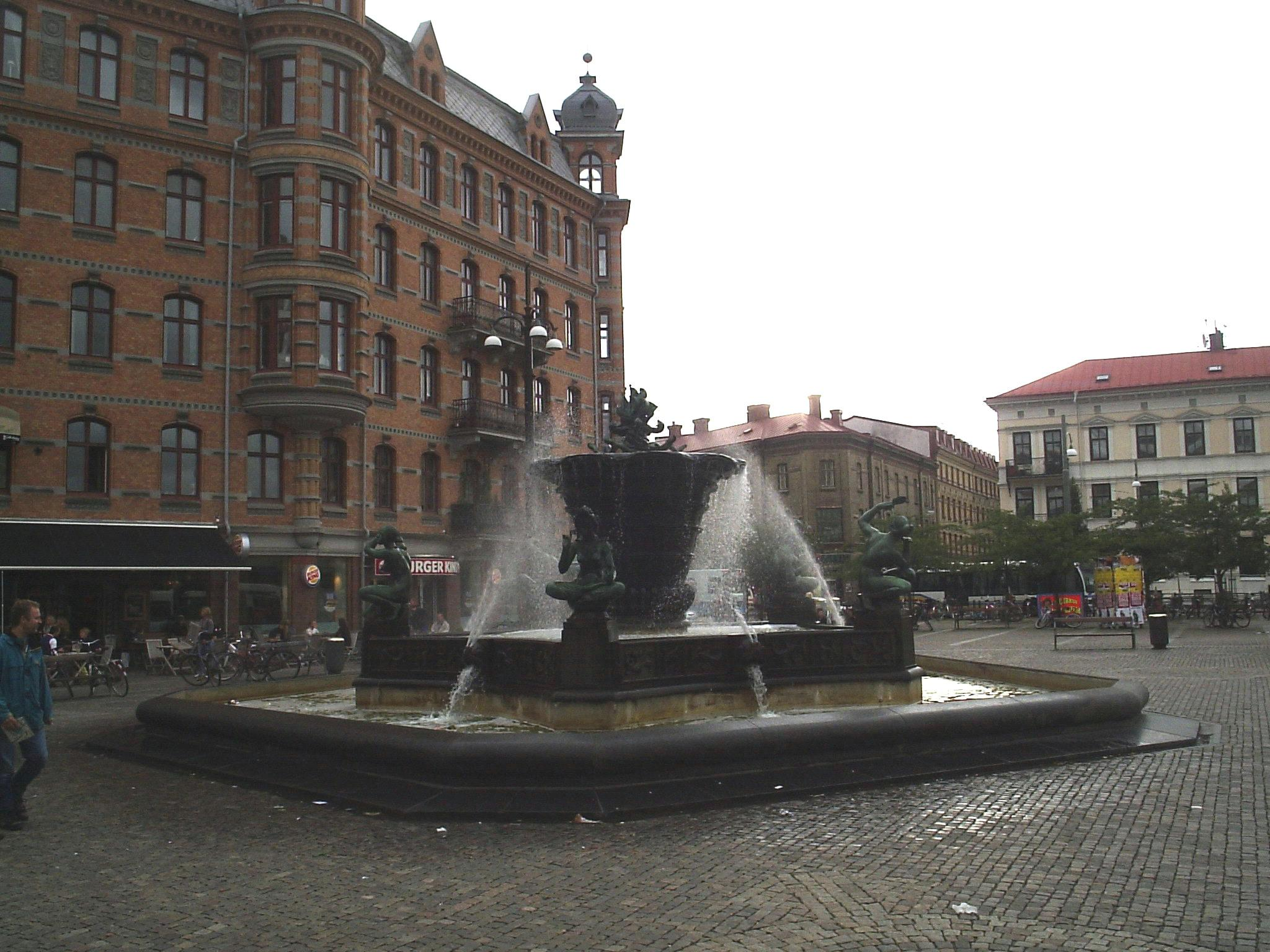
Järntorgsbrunnen (The Five Continents)

Järntorgsbrunnen (Swedish for The Well of the Iron Square), or using the artist's title, De fem världsdelarna (The Five Continents), is a sculpture by Tore Strindberg, inaugurated October 12, 1927, at Järntorget, Göteborg, Sweden.

The sculpture consists of a granite fountain with five nude female bronze sculptures by Tore Strindberg, representing five continents: Africa, America, Asia, Europe and Australia (Oceania). A ship at the top is seen sailing on five streams, symbolizing the five oceans. Since the piece is to commemorate the old iron scale which used to be located on this spot (hence the square's name, The Iron Square), 30 hallmarks from those ironworks who exported their goods via Gothenburg can be seen throughout the sculpture.

== De fem världsdelarna (The Five Continents) ==
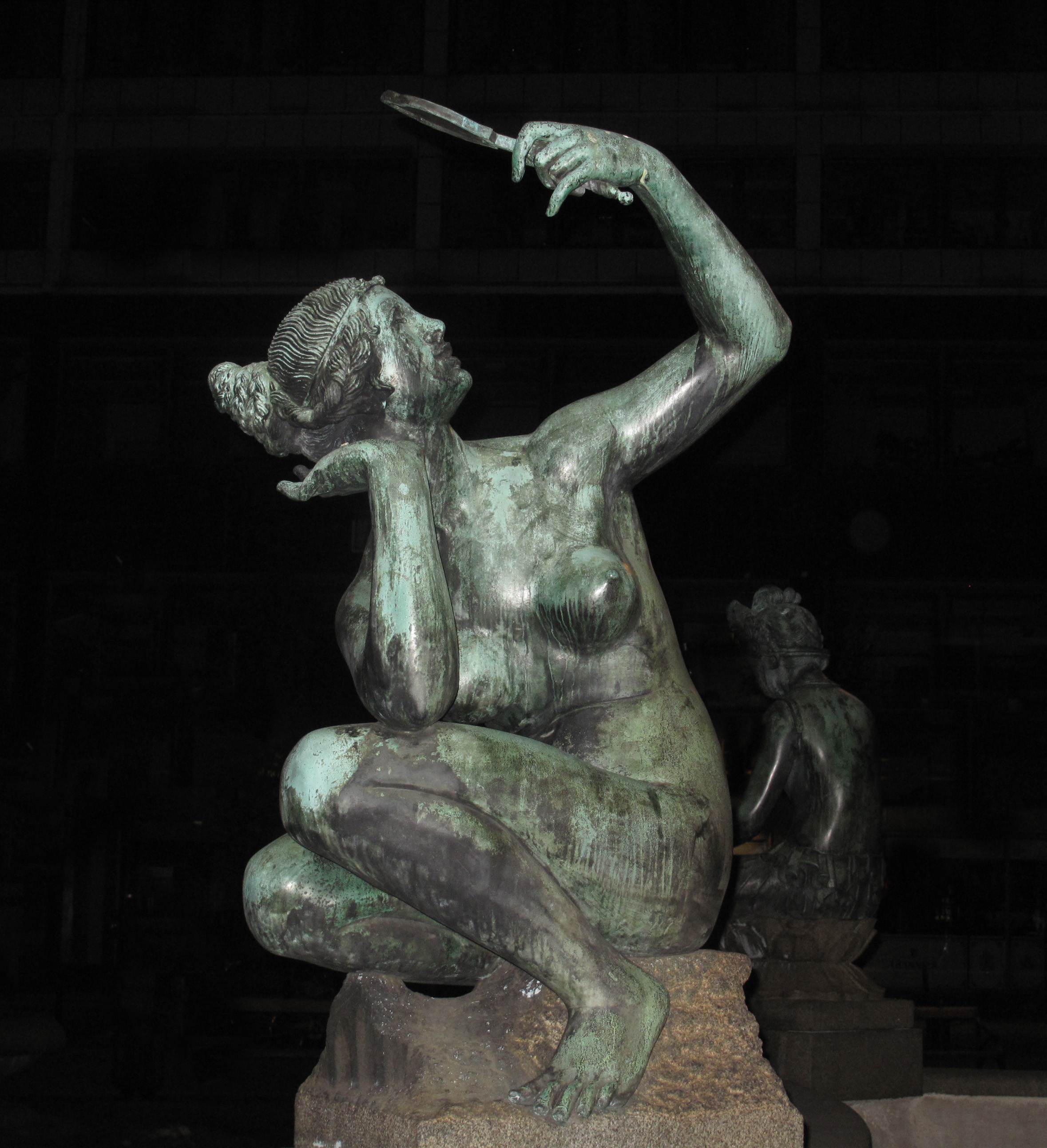
Europe

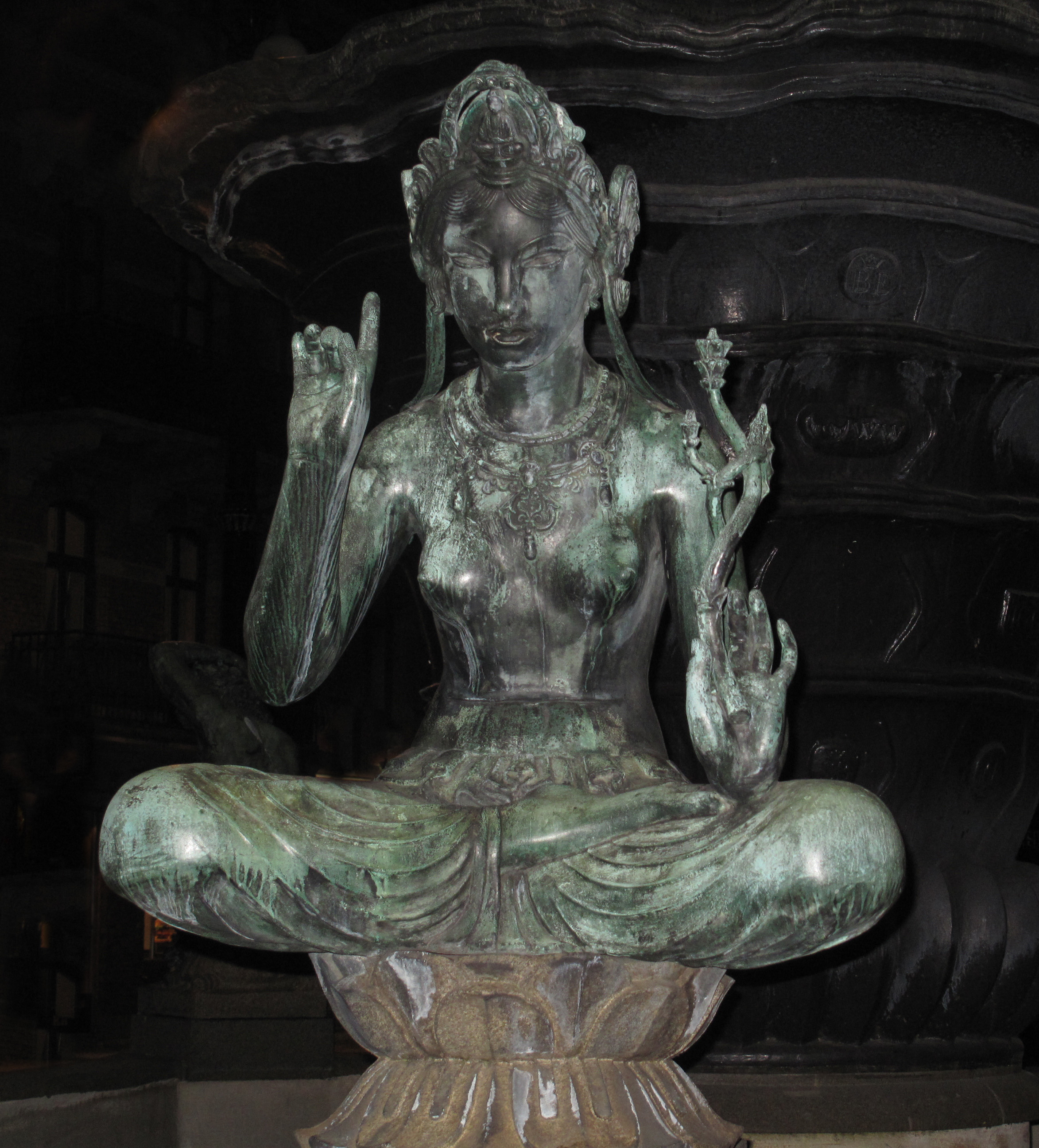
Asia

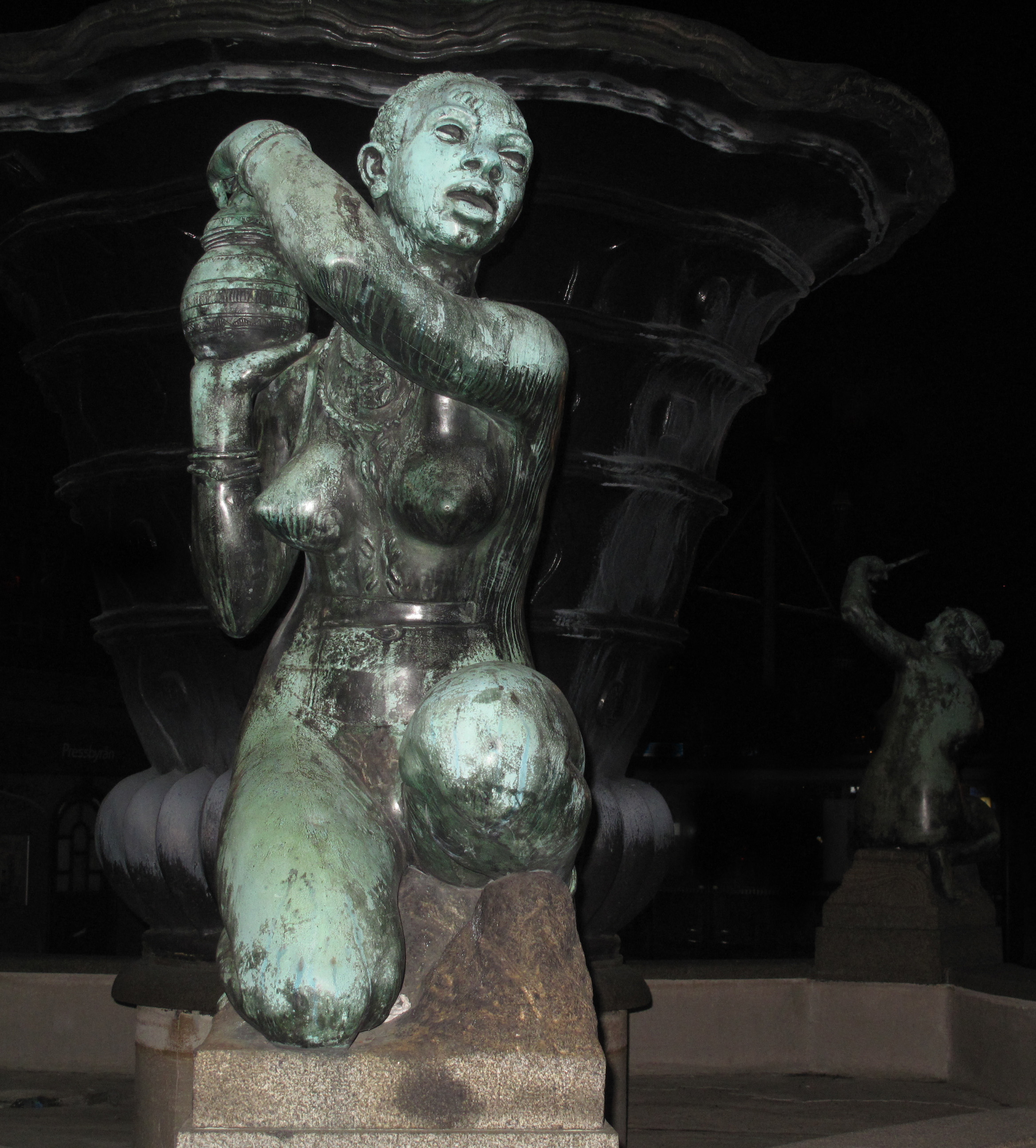
Africa

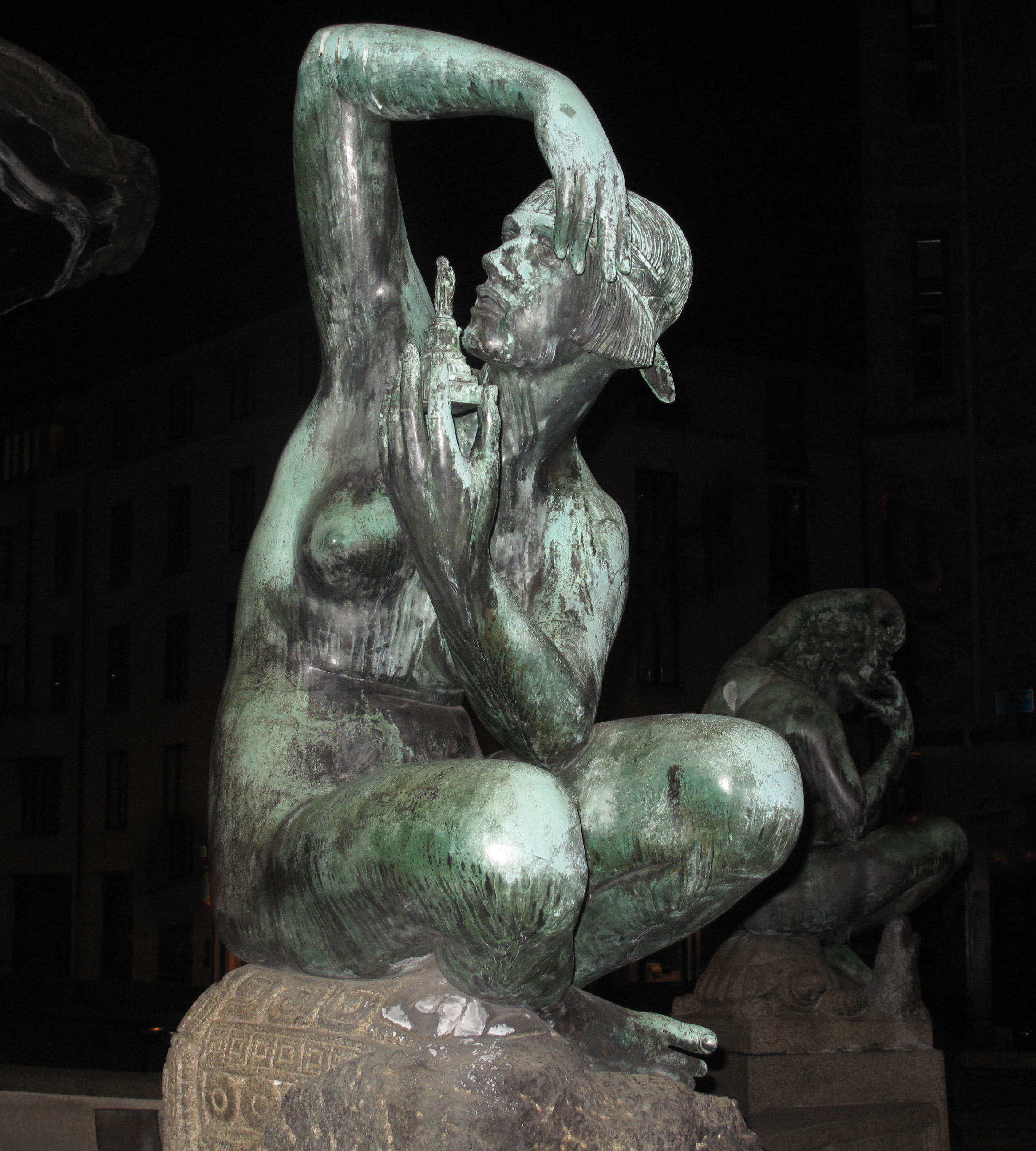
America

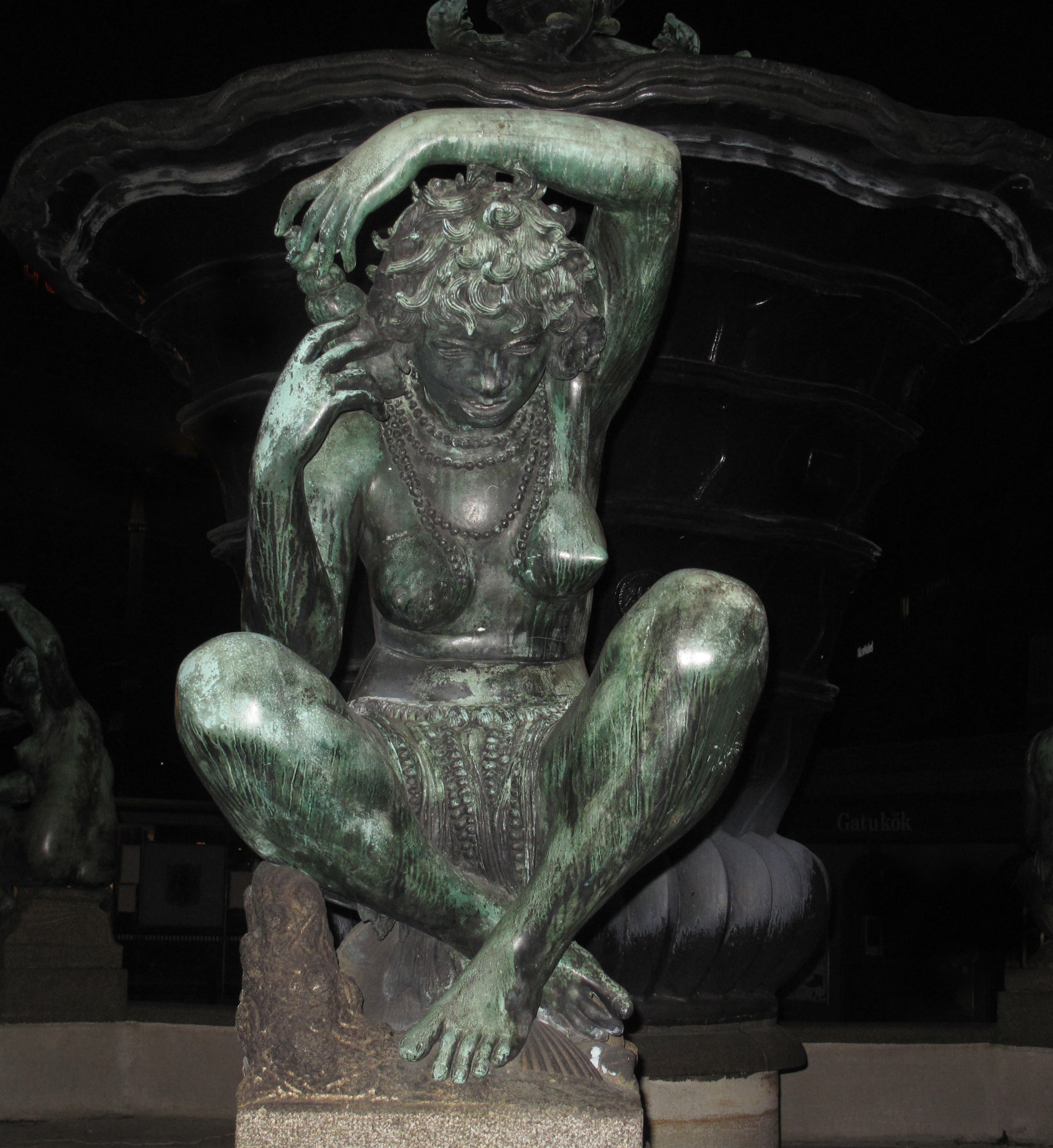
Australia
