= Communist Students League of Sweden (Marxist–Leninists) =

Sveriges Kommunistiska Studentförbund (marxist-leninisterna) (Communist Students League of Sweden (marxist-leninists)), was the student wing of KFML(r).

At the students union elections at University of Gothenburg in 1975, SKS (ml) won two seats (in the previous elections the organization had won 3). In the 1976 and 1977 elections SKS (ml) did not contest.

SKS (ml) was later dissolved. SKS (ml), as well as the party and other organizations close to it, was subject to political surveillance from SÄPO. In 1980 (by the time the organization was disbanded) SÄPO had 76 individuals registered as SKS (ml) members.

SKS (ml) distributed a magazine called Kampens väg (Path of struggle).
