= Young Communist League of Sweden (Marxist–Leninists) =

Far-left youth organization in Sweden

Young Communist League of Sweden (Marxist–Leninists) (in Swedish: Sveriges Kommunistiska Ungdomsförbund (marxist-leninisterna)) was the youth organization of the KFML(r)/KPML(r) during 1972–1978. As SKU(ml) was formed two front organizations of KFML(r), the Solidarity Front for the People of Indochina and Clarté (m-l) were merged into SKU(ml).

SKU(ml) published Ungkommunisten (Young Communist). It also had a publishing activity, called Ungkommunistens Förlag.

SKU(ml), as well as the party and other organizations close to it, was subject to political surveillance from SÄPO. In 1980 (by the time the youth league was disbanded) SÄPO had 203 individuals registered as SKU(ml) members.

== See also ==
- Revolutionary Communist Youth (Sweden)
- Rebell
