= Communist Party (Sweden) =

Communist Party Kommunistiska partiet
- Abbreviation: K
- Chairperson: Povel Johansson
- Founded: 1970
- Split from: Communist Party of Sweden
- Headquarters: Marx-Engelshuset, Fjärde Långgatan 8B, Gothenburg
- Newspaper: Proletären
- Youth wing: Revolutionary Communist Youth
- Ideology: Communism; Marxism–Leninism
- Political position: Far-left
- Colours: Red
- Slogan: Klass Mot Klass ('Class Against Class')
- Municipalities: 2 / 12,978

Website
- kommunisterna.org

The Communist Party (Swedish: Kommunistiska partiet, K) is a Marxist–Leninist political party in Sweden started in 1970. From 1970 to 1977, it was known as the Communist League Marxist–Leninists (Revolutionaries) (Swedish: Kommunistiska Förbundet Marxist-Leninisterna (revolutionärerna), KFML(r)) and from 1977 to 2004 as the Communist Party Marxist–Leninists (Revolutionaries) (Swedish: Kommunistiska Partiet Marxist-Leninisterna (revolutionärerna), KPML(r)). At the 14th Party Congress held in Gothenburg in January 2005, it was decided to change the name to the current one.

KFML(r) was unofficially founded in 1970 by a splinter group from the pro-Chinese KFML, which in turn had split from the Eurocommunist Left Party in 1967. "The (r)s" ("(r)-arna") considered that KFML had approached reformism and was not a genuine workers' movement. In 1970, it began publishing the weekly Proletären (The Proletarian), and the group was officially registered as a political party in 1977. During the 1980s, KPML(r) achieved representation in some municipalities, including Gothenburg, Sweden's second-largest city. The Gothenburg region has always been the strongest area for the party, partly because the party was started there. During the period of 1970 to 1999, the party chairman was Frank Baude. Baude was succeeded by Anders Carlsson, who held the post as chairman between 1999 and 2014. Between 2014 and 2019, Robert Mathiasson was the chairman of the party, he was succeeded by Ulf Nilsson, who only led the party for a short time. Ulf Nilsson resigned as party chairman in January 2020. On the Communist Party's 19th congress in September 2020, Povel Johansson was elected new chairman.

Its members and sympathisers includes, or included, several Swedish celebrities such as actors Sven Wollter, Lasse Brandeby and Kent Andersson and musicians Ken, Totta Näslund and Fred Åkerström, all of whom have participated in events and gatherings arranged by the party.

Party emblem

== Youth organisations ==
In the early days of the party, the pro-KFML(r) fractions of the United FNL Groups (DFFG) and of the Swedish Clarté League broke away and set up the Solidarity Front for the People of Indochina and Clarté (m-l) respectively. In 1972, these two structures were dissolved and merged into the Young Communist League of Sweden (Marxist-Leninists) (Sveriges Kommunistiska Ungdomsförbund (marxist-leninisterna), SKU (ml)), the new KFML(r) youth wing. Later a new students organisation, SKS (ml), was formed. Both SKU (ml) and SKS (ml) were disbanded towards the end of the 1970s as the party itself consisted mainly of young people.

In 1994, the party again launched a youth organization, Revolutionary Communist Youth (RKU).

== International relations ==
The party upholds close relations with the Popular Front for the Liberation of Palestine, the Communist Party of the Philippines, the Workers' Party of Belgium, the Communist Party of Greece, the Polisario Front and others.

During the North Korean famine, the party participated in charity fundraising for the delivery of humanitarian aid to North Korea. As a result, the party developed a degree of collaboration with the Workers' Party of Korea, although this cooperation did not persist to the present day.

Factions within the Swedish left during the last century

== Illegal surveillance by the Swedish Security Service ==
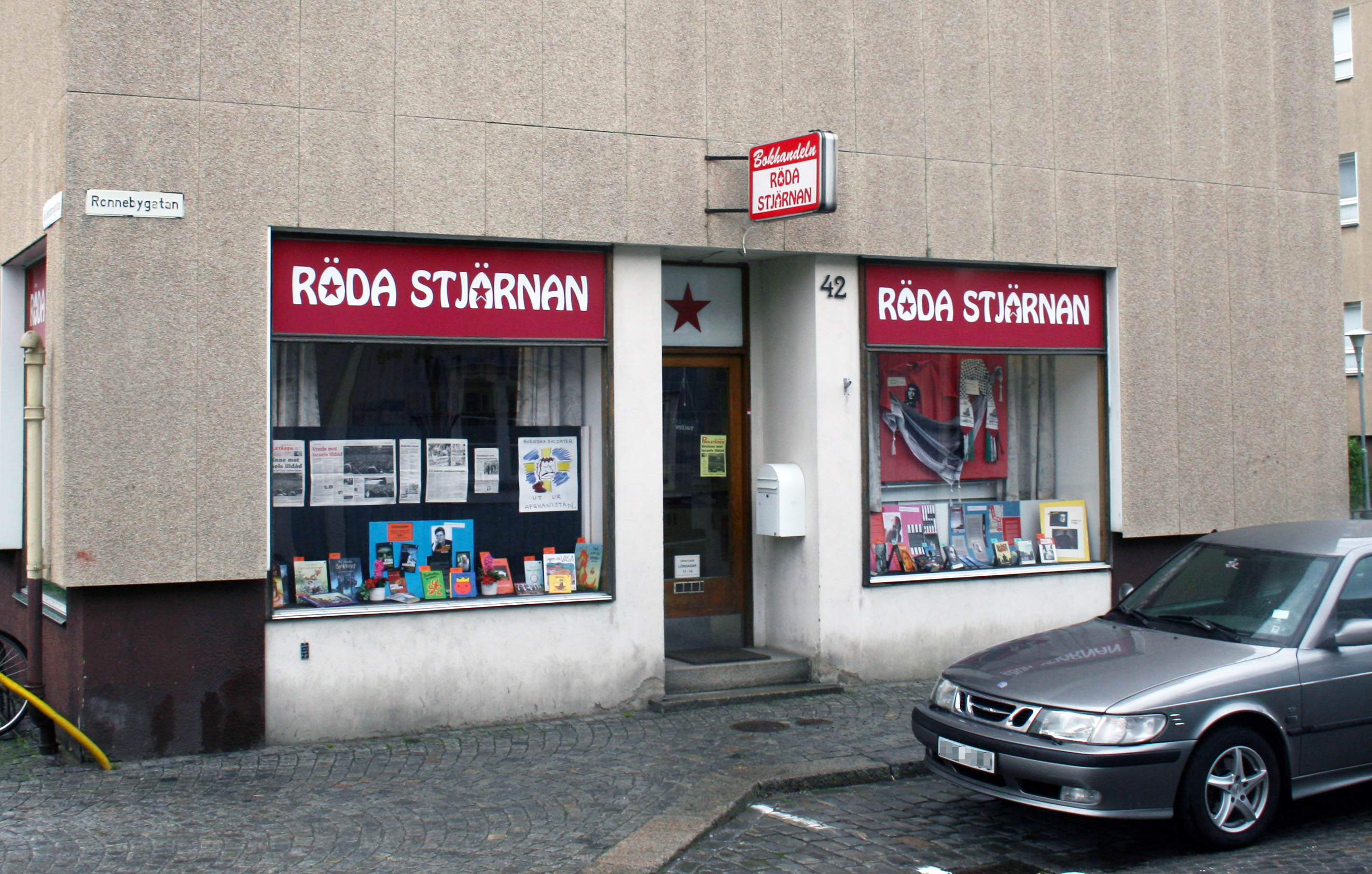
The party's book shop Röda Stjärnan (Red Star) in the city of Karlshamn

In 1969, governmental registration of an individual's political affiliation was made illegal in Sweden. However, in 2003 it was revealed that the Swedish Security Service (Säpo) already in 1970 had been secretly instructed by the Swedish government to continue surveillance of "key individuals" in some twenty organisations on the far-left and far-right of Swedish politics in spite of that ban. This surveillance continued until 1998. KFML(r)/KPML(r) and its associated organisations were among those put under such surveillance. When the files were made public, they revealed that the number of surveilled individuals of the party ranged from 2,012 in 1985 to 1,346 in 1998, which meant that almost all party members had been under surveillance.

== Electoral results ==
The party does not participate in elections to the national nor the European Parliaments. It does not participate in the national elections due to financial and tactical reasons whereas it advocates boycott of the European parliament elections. However, it does participate in the municipal elections in some Swedish municipalities. In 2010, the party participated in the elections in 18 municipalities, which is the largest number of municipalities so far. Its electoral results have fluctuated over time, with high results in various cities during the late 1990s (second-largest party in Karlshamn, for example). In the three most recent elections, the party has lost ground electorally.

Municipality	Votes 2018	Seats 2018	Votes 2014	Seats 2014	Votes 2010	Seats 2010	Votes 2006	Seats 2006	Votes 2002	Seats 2002	Votes 1998	Seats 1998
Alingsås	223	0	155	0	180	0	243	0	204	0	164	0
Borås	127	0	–	–	–	–	–	–	–	–	–	–
Gislaved	525	1	471	1	610	2	794	2	1,099	3	1,545	4
Gnosjö	–	–	–	–	–	–	65	0	–	–	–	–
Gothenburg	1,722	0	1,862	0	2,512	0	3,701	0	4,296	0	3,797	0
Helsingborg	–	–	116	0	180	0	211	0	427	0	–	–
Jönköping	185	0	173	0	332	0	300	0	328	0	–	–
Karlshamn	304	0	384	0	520	1	847	2	2,092	6	2,469	7
Karlstad	259	0	137	0	–	–	–	–	–	–	–	–
Kristianstad	186	0	108	0	169	0	231	0	308	0	177	0
Ludvika	363	1	182	0	161	0	166	0	–	–	–	–
Lund	–	–	77	0	101	0	–	–	–	–	–	–
Lysekil	633	2	638	2	682	3	525	2	429	2	414	2
Malmö	–	–	209	0	324	0	451	0	477	0	319	0
Mölndal	–	–	79	0	–	–	–	–	–	–	–	–
Norrköping	214	0	212	0	261	0	362	0	–	–	–	–
Nybro	83	0	125	0	–	–	–	–	–	–	–	–
Robertsfors	58	0	50	0	–	–	–	–	–	–	–	–
Sandviken	–	–	91	0	–	–	–	–	–	–	–	–
Stockholm	–	–	307	0	402	0	449	0	511	0	765	0
Trelleborg	60	0	43	0	53	0	–	–	–	–	–	–
Uddevalla	–	–	101	0	–	–	–	–	–	–	–	–
Uppsala	–	–	181	0	337	0	497	0	451	0	196	0
Varberg	456	0	–	–	–	–	–	–	–	–	–	–
Värnamo	–	–	42	0	97	0	–	–	–	–	–	–
Västerås	–	–	190	0	–	–	–	–	149	0	116	0
Växjö	198	0	208	0	300	0	323	0	301	0	–	–
Örebro	197	0	228	0	191	0	–	–	–	–	–	–
Östersund	–	–	–	–	–	–	267	0	–	–	–	–
Total:	5,791	4	6,369	3	7,412	6	9,432	6	11,072	11	9,962	13
