= Robert Mathiasson =

Swedish politician (born 1979)

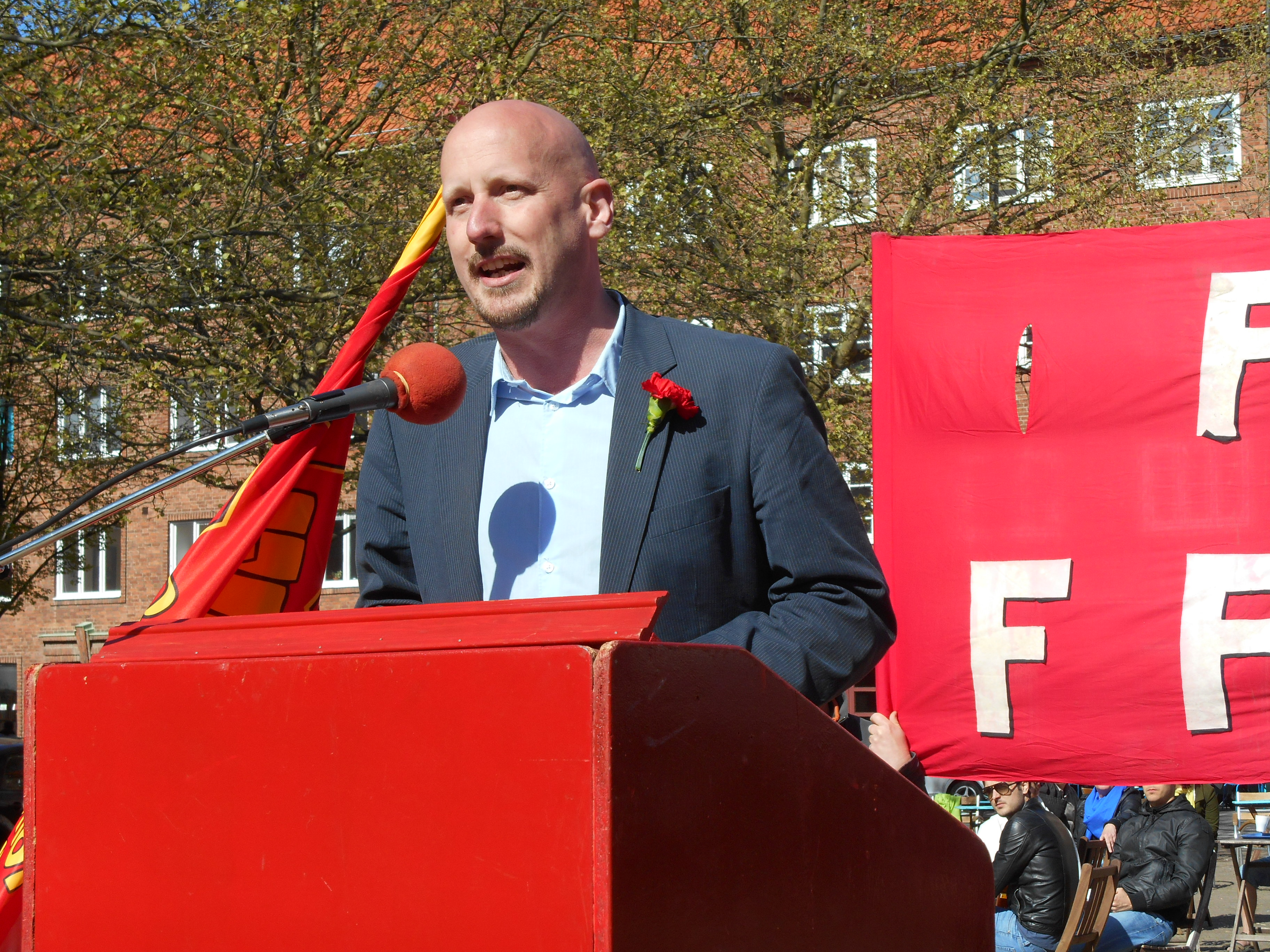
- Robert Mathiasson speaking on International Workers' Day, 2014.

Chairman of the Communist Party (Sweden)
- In office 2014–2019
- Preceded by: Anders Carlsson
- Succeeded by: Ulf Nilsson

Personal details
- Born: 26 February 1979 (age 47) Lund, Sweden
- Party: Communist Party(until 2019)

Bengt Robert Mathiasson, born 26 February 1979 in Lund, is a Swedish politician who served as chairman of Sweden's Communist Party from 2014 until 2019. He succeeded Anders Carlsson at the 17th party congress in Gothenburg, held in 2014. He has worked as a removal man in Stockholm and as an industrial worker at a Volvo factory in Gothenburg. Mathiasson was previously chairman of Revolutionary Communist Youth between 2002 and 2004. In December 2019, Mathiasson left the Communist Party and, since 2020, he has been a columnist for a right-wing political online newspaper.
