= Solidarity Front for the People of Indochina =

Vietnam solidarity organisation

Solidarity Front for the People of Indochina (in Swedish: Solidaritetsfronten för Indokinas Folk) was an organization in Sweden, created by KFML(r) to mobilize support for the struggles of the people of Indochina during the Vietnam War. SFIF was formed following the expulsion/departure of the KFML(r) supporters from the major Vietnam solidarity movement DFFG, which was led by KFML.

The pro-KFML(r) fraction within DFFG had argued that DFFG had to take a stand in Swedish class struggle issues simultaneously as supporting the struggles in Indochina.

SFIF published Vietnam-Solidaritet (external publication) and Klassolidaritet (internal publication).

SFIF was dissolved in 1972, and merged into the Young Communist League of Sweden (marxist-leninists).
