= Swedish Committee for Vietnam =

Swedish non-government organization

- Svenska Kommittén för Vietnam
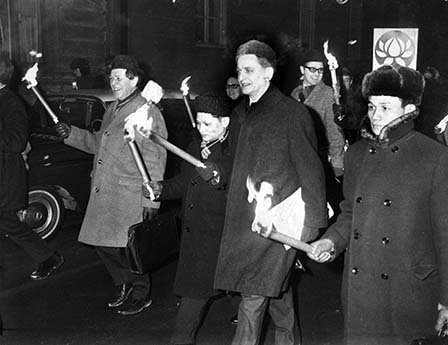
- Abbreviation: SKfV
- Formation: 1967
- Website: skvlk.se/projekt.html

The Swedish Committee for Vietnam [SKfV – Svenska Kommittén för Vietnam] was a pacifist non-governmental organization founded in Sweden in 1967 that supported North-Vietnam in the Vietnam War. The SKfV was a restructuring of the former Swedish Vietnam Committee [SVK – Svenska Vietnamkommittén]. The committee was aimed at supporting North Vietnam and strongly opposed American involvement in Vietnam with the slogan "Peace in Vietnam" through monetary aid, the torchlight procession, providing asylum for draft evaders, and letters to the Swedish government. Politically left leaning, the SKfV was tied to the Social Democratic Party. The SKfV aimed to increase public focus and involvement in Vietnam. The SKfV pushed the Swedish government to critique the United States over its involvement in what was formerly French Indochina and organized campaigns to raise support for North Vietnam. This campaign exacerbated the worsening Swedish-United States tensions over the American War in Vietnam. In 1974, the SKfV increased its scope to include Cambodia and Laos, marking its second rebranding, prior to the American withdrawal from Vietnam in 1979 and the Vietnamese invasion of Cambodia. The Swedish Committee for Vietnam, Laos, and Cambodia (Swedish: Svenska kommittén för Vietnam, Laos och Kambodja) continues to operate today.

== Notable figures ==
Various prominent figures were members of the Swedish Committee for Vietnam.

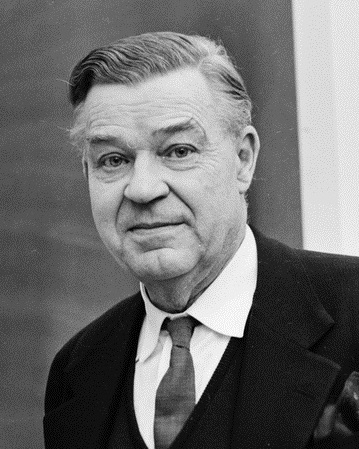
Gunnar Myrdal, Chairman from 1968 to 1971

=== Chairmen ===
1. Evert Svensson (Interim chairman 4 October 1967 – 24 January 1968)
2. Gunnar Myrdal (Chairman from 1968 to 1971)
3. Birgitta Dahl (Chairman from 1971 to 1977)

=== Other notable members ===
1. Hans Göran Frank
2. John Takaman
3. Hjalmar Mehr
4. Per Anders Fogelström
5. Bertil Svahnström

== History ==
=== Swedish-United States relations ===
Even with trade between the two nations at an all-time high, many American diplomats viewed Sweden as suspicious due to their neutrality in the First and Second World wars and their relations with the German Empire and Nazi Germany. In 1965, government officials in Stockholm openly critiqued American policy in the Vietnam war. Later, in 1968, the then Swedish Minister of Education and later Prime Minister Olof Palme participated in a protest in Stockholm (organised by the SKfV). He protested with the North Vietnamese ambassador to the Soviet Union, Nguyễn Thọ Chân against US involvement in Vietnam. Sweden was the only Western nation to openly grant asylum to draft dodgers, such as former soldier Terry Whitmore. Relations would only begin to improve after Thorbjörn Fälldin came into office in 1976 and the later inauguration of Ingvar Carlsson in 1986.

=== Background ===
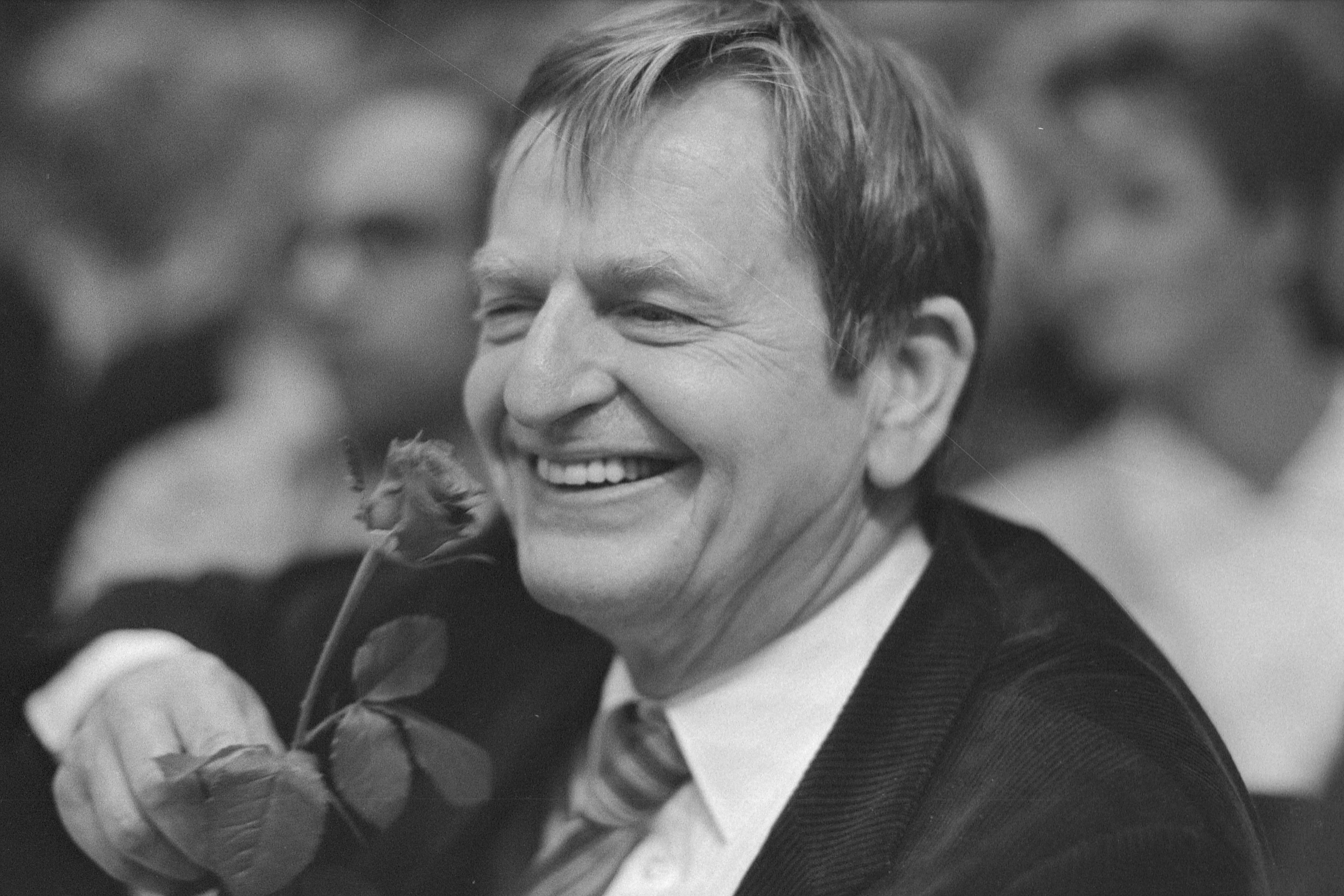
Olof Palme, Former Minister of Sweden

Olof Palme was a key politician in the Swedish government surrounding the Vietnam War. In the summer of 1965, Palme [then Minister of Education and Ecclesiastical Affairs] gave an influential speech highlighting the increased political tension in the world and that the struggle for national freedom was "inextricably linked to the quest for social and economic emancipation." Palme expressed Swedish responsibility to stand up for the oppressed against their oppressors. Although Palme only mentioned Vietnam at the end of his speech, the public eye interpreted Palme's words as an indirect criticism of US involvement in Vietnam. The bourgeois press interpreted Palme's speech as furthering his own political agenda while the Foreign Minister Torsten Nilsson was away on government business. Upon returning a few weeks later, Nilsson gave a speech to ease tensions, criticizing both the United States of America and the Soviet Union. Nilsson described Sweden's line of neutrality as "best expressed if we speak bluntly in either direction".

For Sweden's Social Democrats, the Vietnam issue posed a risk that younger, radical groups would go farther left on the political spectrum. Within the Social Democrats, then Prime Minister Tage Erlander expressed that it had always been natural for radical left-wing groups to be channelled by the party, and that this should continue to be the case. The National Liberation Front (NLF) movement was seen by the Social Democratic leadership as an expression of youth revolt, and it was precisely young people that the party was afraid of losing when they offered the lowest development aid strategy of all parties.

=== Establishment ===
The Swedish Committee on Vietnam (SKfV) was a formal restructuring of the pre-existing entity, the Swedish Vietnam Committee [SVK]. The committee was created and operational in 1967. The SKfV primarily received funding through Social Democratic organizations and unions.

After the first Swedish demonstrations protesting the US in Vietnam in 1964, several committees such as the SKfV, National Vietnam Fund [Naionalinsamlingen för Vietnam], and the Support Committee for the Stockholm Conferences on Vietnam [Stödkomittén för Stockholmskonferenserna om Vietnam] became the organizational background to the formation of the SKfV. The SKfV's official purpose was to lead public opinion on the Vietnam war while preventing extremists from usurping the antiwar movement.

The SKfV consisted of political, trade unions, and free church organizations elected to its board. By 1971, 33 national organizations and 212 local organisations were members of SKfV, with the majority being either trade unions or social democratic associations.

=== The United NLF-Groups (DFFG) and Swedish Committee on Vietnam (SKfV) Relations ===
The United NLF-Groups [DFFG, De Förenade FNL-Grupperna, a Swedish popular movement in support of the FNL-movement] saw the formation of the committee as an attempt by the Social Democrats to gain control of the Swedish NLF movement. They viewed the Swedish Committee on Vietnam (SKfV) as a bureaucratic organization dependent on the Swedish government for its activities.

By the end of 1969, the SKfV and the DFFG were planning to hold a joint demonstration. While it was initially promising, this cooperation broke down when the SKfV presented a draft resolution on providing government aid to North Vietnam. The DFFG expressed opposition to the resolution on the grounds that it was presented in a politically incorrect manner.

Over time, the DFFG became increasingly convinced that the best way to support the people of Indochina was for the two organizations to work together. Instead of complementing each other, they would cooperate to strengthen popular Swedish anti-war sentiment. During the autumn of 1972, the two organizations worked together at the local level, although not always without conflict due to the SKfV's scepticism of the DFFG.

== Activities ==
The main demands made by the SKfV were for the US to stop bombing Vietnam, to withdraw its troops from the country, and for the Vietnamese people to be allowed to make decisions about their country. On several fronts, their demands were in line with those of the global NLF movement, as well as the DFFG's, including demands for US withdrawal and the sovereignty of the Vietnamese people. However, there were also significant differences. The SKfV did not accept criticism of the Swedish government nor did it approve of the DFFG's unconventional working methods.

=== Charity-financial assistance to Vietnam ===
In the Spring of 1966 the Swedish Committee on Vietnam (SKfV) began the National Collection for Vietnam, a charity with support from all five parliamentary parties as well as businesses. By early 1969, the committee had succeeded in securing assistance to North Vietnam.

=== Torchlight procession ===
The most internationally publicized action taken by the Spanish Committee on Vietnam was their torchlight procession through Stockholm on 21 February 1968. Olof Palme, although not a formal member of the SKfV, walked beside the then-North Vietnamese Ambassador in Moscow, Nguyễn Thọ Chân as show of public support for Vietnam.

==== Tensions of the Procession ====
Despite their general disagreement with the SKfV, Stockholm's local NLF groups participated in the demonstration due to an agreement with its general goals. However, they aimed to boycott the final meeting to protest against Olof Palme and Gunnar Myrdal because of their work against the NLF movement. NLF groups had met with Nguyễn Thọ Chân a few days before the demonstration and tried to persuade him not to participate, explaining to him the creation of the SKfV as a way to control the radical left. However, Nguyễn made it clear that he would participate, an act that encouraged NLF-groups to join. The march became Sweden's largest Vietnam War demonstration to date and further strained diplomatic relations between Sweden and the USA.

=== Asylum for United States military draft evaders ===
Due to Olof Palme's march with Nguyễn Thọ Chân, the US withdrew its ambassador William Womack Heath on 8 March 1968. The Committee issued a letter demonstrating their support for Palme. Later, the Swedish Committee for Vietnam (SKfV) convinced the Swedish Government to allow asylum to American draft dodgers. This asylum later enabled these deserters to create their committee, the American Deserters Association in February 1986.

== Current activities ==
The Swedish Committee for Vietnam (SKfV) continues to operate in Vietnam, Laos, and Cambodia; but they have shifted their attention in the modern day to support those affected by Agent Orange in cooperation with the Agricultural University in Hue, located in central Vietnam. This support is mainly for fundraising and finances.

== Timeline/Operational History of the SKfV ==
- 1964– Swedish anti-war demonstrations protesting the US campaign in Vietnam begin.
- August 1965 – The Swedish Vietnam Committee is founded.
- Spring 1966 – The SKfV begins the National Collection for Vietnam.
- 6–9 July 1967 – World Conference on Vietnam gets held in Stockholm
- 4 October 1967 – The SKV is officially replaced by the Swedish Committee for Vietnam (SKfV). Chaired by Evert Svensson, parliament member of the Association of Christian Social Democrats (SKSF).
- 4 January 1968 – Gunnar Myrdal replaces Svensson.
- 10 February 1968 – The Social Democratic Party agrees to grant the committee financial support.
- 13 February 1968 – Swedish Committee for Vietnam (SKfV) adoptes the Appeal for the People of Vietnam program
- 21 February 1968 – Palme (then minister of education) protests against US involvement in Vietnam with North Vietnamese ambassador Nguyễn Thọ Chân.
- 8 March 1968 – The United States withdraws its Ambassador William W. Heath in response to Palme's march
- 10 January 1969 – Sweden is the first Western nation to recognize North Vietnam.
- 1971 – Birgitta Dahl gets enacted as the new chairman for the SKfV.
- 1974 – The Swedish Committee for Vietnam rebrands to the Swedish Committee for Vietnam, Laos, and Cambodia [Svenska kommittén för Vietnam, Laos, och Kambodja]
- 25 December 1978 – Vietnam invades Cambodia
- March 1979 – Last American troops withdraw from Vietnam.

== See also ==
- Swedish Social Democrats
- United NLF Groups
- Sweden–United States relations
- Vietnam War
- Vietnam War resisters in Sweden
- Gunnar Myrdal
- Olof Palme
- Assassination of Olof Palme
- Stockholm Conference
