= United NLF Groups =

DFFG poster from 1972. Text reads "Target of the winter: Five million [Swedish krona] to FNL!"

The United NLF Groups (Swedish: De förenade FNL-grupperna, abbreviated DFFG, colloquially FNL-grupperna, 'NLF Groups', or FNL-rörelsen, 'NLF movement') was a Swedish popular movement that sought to mobilize support for the struggle of the Vietnamese National Liberation Front (known by its French acronym 'FNL').

DFFG became one of the most successful Swedish popular movements in later years, the organization was able to mobilize thousands of young people to demonstrations, street sales of Vietnambulletinen (the publication of DFFG), leafletings, fund collections, etc. DFFG came to dominate Swedish public debate about the Vietnam War during several years. Jan Myrdal played a prominent role for the DFFG, but was never a member of the board.

== Origins ==
DFFG used the same flag as the Vietnamese FNL

In February 1964 the Stockholm branch of Clarté started a study circle on the topic 'USA in the world of today'. Bo Gustafsson was the main speaker. Participants included Sköld Peter Matthis, Åsa Hallström and Gunnar Bylin. The group began holding protests in 1965. At first the Clarté activists held their protest outside the U.S. embassy, noticed by few. On June 14, 1965 a small group of clartéists gathered on Hötorget in central Stockholm. The protest was broken up by police, and Sköld Petter Matthis was arrested. The event, and subsequent trial of Matthis, was covered in several newsmedia and made the movement known nationwide. Later the same year the first NLF Group was formed.

== Emergence of the movement ==
NLF groups then began to appear in Uppsala, Lund, Linköping, Örebro and Gothenburg, all cities with universities. DFFG was formed as a contact network of local activist groups in April 1966. In 1967 it was consolidated into a national organization. Sköld Petter Matthis became the chairman of DFFG. By 1967 it had grown to 20 local groups, in 1969 there were 90 and in 1973 DFFG consisted of 150 local groups. Politically, the Communist League Marxist-Leninists (KFML) wielded insignificant influence in the DFFG.

DFFG was built up on the lines of a united front, based on three core demands; 1) USA out of Vietnam, 2) Support the people of Vietnam on their own terms, 3) Fight US imperialism.

== Polemics against the pacifists ==
Poster for 'Vietnam Week' of 1971. Main slogan reads 'USA out of Indochina'.

DFFG was, however, neither the only nor the first Vietnam solidarity movement in Sweden at the time. In the spring of 1965 the Swedish Vietnam Committee had been formed, with older activists from peace and anti-nuclear movements. In 1966 the communist parliamentarian John Takman, one of few Swedes that had visited Vietnam and met several times with Ho Chi Minh, launched the publication Vietnam-Press.

The Communist Party, with Takman as their most prominent spokesperson on Vietnam, and the Social Democratic Party argued in favour of the position of 'Peace in Vietnam'. In 1968 the Swedish Committee for Vietnam was formed, as a continuation of the Swedish Vietnam Committee, the National Fundraiser for Vietnam and the Support Committee for the Stockholm Conferences on Vietnam, with Gunnar Myrdal as its chairman.

DFFG was built up polemizing against the 'Peace in Vietnam' line. The 'Peace in Vietnam' line was denounced for not differentiating between aggressor and victim. Takman, who was seen as representing Soviet revisionism, was one of the foremost targets of the DFFG propaganda.

== New phenomenon in Swedish politics ==
The DFFG brought previously unknown protest methods into Swedish politics, such as wildcat marches, sit-in protests and aggressive sloganeering. Initially, this caused discontent amongst older Swedes. The Swedish police had no previous experience of wildcat marches, and on several occasions minor violent confrontations erupted. American diplomats were targeted with eggs, tomatoes and occasionally, surströmming. DFFG took an uncompromising stand against the Swedish social democracy and the Swedish government, and one of the most frequent slogans of the movement was Tage och Geijer - Lyndons lakejer ('Tage [Erlander] and [Arne] Geijer - lackeys of Lyndon [B. Johnson]'). In a 1970 debate on foreign affairs in the parliament, both Prime Minister Olof Palme and Foreign Minister Torsten Nilsson referred to the DFFG activists as 'rascals'. However, relations of the DFFG with the older generation and Swedish labour movement were improved as the organization tuned down its more confrontational actions (such as banning egg throwing in their demonstrations). It also began discussions with the Swedish Committee for Vietnam on the possibilities of cooperation.

In 1970 Ulf Mårtensson became the new chairman of DFFG. In 1970, DFFG had a local organization in 116(40%) of Sweden's municipalities.

== Splits ==
DFFG suffered two major splits during its early phase, the 'Rebels' of 1968 and the 'Liquidators' of 1970. In the spring of 1968 the so-called 'Rebel Movement', self-styled Red Guards, emerged in Uppsala and Lund. The Rebels sought to take over DFFG and demanded that the organization should, in their own words, be based on 'Mao Tse-Tung Thought'. At its height 300-400 of the DFFG activists had sided with the Rebels. The confrontations between the Rebels and others in DFFG paralyzed the activities in the Malmö local group, and temporary partially paralyzed some activities of DFFG in Stockholm and Uppsala. However, by the summer of 1968 the Rebel Movement self-imploded.

In 1970 DFFG suffered a split parallel to the split that was taking place in KFML. A group in Gothenburg had called for DFFG to become an explicitly socialist organization and support KFML in elections. Their demands were rebuffed by the leadership of the organization. The group, consisting of the followers of KFML(r) inside DFFG, broke away from DFFG and formed the Solidarity Front for the People of Indochina in January 1971.

== May Day 1972 ==
On May Day 1972, a joint rally was held in Stockholm; co-organized by the Stockholm NLF Group, the Swedish Committee for Vietnam, Social Democratic Party, the Left Party - Communists and KFML. The main speaker at Norra Bantorget was Nguyen Van Thien, the head of the PRG delegation at the Paris Peace Talks- Tha meeting at Norra Bentorget in Stockholm that gathered 50,000 people, the largest protest meeting ever held in Sweden.

In 1972 DFFG bought itself a new office space, a 1,000 square meter basement real estate on Döbelnsgatan in central Stockholm.

On December 23, 1972, Swedish Prime Minister Olof Palme gave a highly publicized speech in which he compared the recent U.S. bombing of Hanoi to the atrocities of the Nazis during World War II, something that was strongly disapproved of by the U.S. government. Olof Palme had traditionally been a strong friend of the United States.

== On Soviet social imperialism ==
1973 'Vietnam Week' poster. Slogan reads 'With FNL for the people of Vietnam - Recognize PRG - The solidarity work continues'.

Generally DFFG avoided taking a public stand on non-Vietnam/Indochina-related issues. It did however condemn the Soviet military intervention in Czechoslovakia in 1968. Gradually DFFG became more outspoken in their anti-Soviet positions, which in turn caused conflicts within the movement. In 1974 the author Sara Lidman publicly protested against the anti-Soviet postures of DFFG. The 1975 congress of DFFG (held after the Vietnamese victory) removed the slogan "Fight U.S. imperialism", with the rationale than a movement that solely condemned U.S. imperialism would become a tool of 'Soviet social imperialism'.

== Peace treaty ==
With the signing of the Paris Peace Accords and the withdrawal of U.S. combat forces from Vietnam in 1973, the intensity of the Vietnam solidarity work declined. Following the coup d'état in Chile, sectors of the activist milieu began reorienting themselves towards solidarity work with Latin America. The Chile Committee was, however, not connected to KFML, nor did it reach the strength that DFFG had during its peak.

== 1975: Victory of FNL ==
Upon the declaration of FNL victory's in 1975, DFFG activists gathered at the Östermalm representation office of the Provisional Revolutionary Government in celebrations. The following day, 15,000 people celebrated the victory in Stockholm on May 1, 1975.

== Vietnam-China war and disbanding ==
In 1977 DFFG was renamed the Vietnam and Laos League for Friendship and Solidarity (Vietnam- & Laosförbundet för vänskap och solidaritet). The 1978 Cambodian–Vietnamese War would mean the end of the organization. It had split into three factions, one group fully supporting Vietnam, one fully condemning Vietnam and supporting the Chinese attack on Vietnam and a third group that opposed the Vietnamese invasion of Cambodia but did not support the Chinese attack on Vietnam. The organization was disbanded on May 14, 1979.

== Cultural impact ==
An important factor to the success of the DFFG was the strong support the movement was able to gather amongst prominent artists and intellectuals at the time, such as Jan Myrdal, Sara Lidman, Lars Forssell, Cornelis Vreeswijk and Fred Åkerström. The posters of the organization were often painted by well-known artists.

== Publication ==
DFFG published Vietnambulletinen ('The Vietnam Bulltine'), which was sold by DFFG activists outside Systembolaget shops and in the streets. The first issue was published in May 1965. At its peak, Vietnambulletinen had a circulation of 50,000.

== Security Police Surveillance ==
From the formation of the first DFFG group in Stockholm, the activities were monitored by the Swedish Security Police (SÄPO), which used information from infiltrators, visits to and surveillance of the homes of leading activists, photography of meetings and demonstrations, and wiretapping of organization phones and the private phones of leading members. A number of people were registered by SÄPO. The threat that was considered to justify this concerned suspicions of control and financing from China, as well as the question of the subversive or revolutionary nature of the movement.

During the first year of the DFFG, SÄPO spent significant resources on monitoring and registering leading people in the DFFG groups, monitoring certain addresses, and wiretapping. SÄPO investigated various suspicions, but none of this led to the prosecution of any person due to the person's connection to the DFFG groups. The crimes that could be proven were so minor that they did not lead to prosecution. For example: A DFFG group had not applied for permission from the Police for a demonstration that had then been carried out in good order. Gradually, SÄPO's interest in the organization decreased because it was not possible to prove that there were any illegal connections to foreign powers or foreign funding. Gradually, the DFFG movement's demand that the United States should leave Vietnam became an opinion that had very broad support in Sweden, including in the Riksdag.

A government investigation into the surveillance of, among others, the DFFG found in 2002 that the degree of realism of the threat image remains unclear and that the surveillance and registration, regardless of the justification, appear to have been excessive, misdirected and sometimes illegal.

== Bibliography ==
DFFG May Day poster from 1973. Slogan reads 'Unity - Solidarity - 1 May, Solidarity with the people of Indochina'.

In 1975 DFFG published FNL i Sverige: Reportage om en folkrörelse under tio år ('FNL in Sweden: Report on a people's movement during ten years') a detailed account of the history of the organization from its own perspective. The first major academic study on the DFFG was published in 1996, Rebeller i takt med tiden: FNL-rörelsen och 60-talets politiska ritualer by Lund University historian Kim Salomon. and reviews the DFFG from a rightwing standpoint. DFFG's highest decision-making body and lower-level leaders repeatedly rejected all suggestions that DFFG should work for socialism or communism. Despite this, has Salomon claimed that DFFG had a "Janus' face", showing a non-communist exterior, socialism h whilst internally being run by KFML for political purposes.

Vietnam var nära : en berättelse om FNL-rörelsen och solidaritetsarbetet i Sverige 1965-1975 ('Vietnam was close: an account on the FNL-movement and the solidarity work in Sweden 1965-1975') by Åke Kilander was released in 2007. The book was labelled a 'coffee table book' in a Svenska Dagbladet editorial. Kilander is a former DFFG activist himself. The book is based on interviews amongst former DFFG activists.
