= Järntorget, Gothenburg =

Square in Gothenburg, Sweden

Coordinates: 57°41′59″N 11°57′10″E

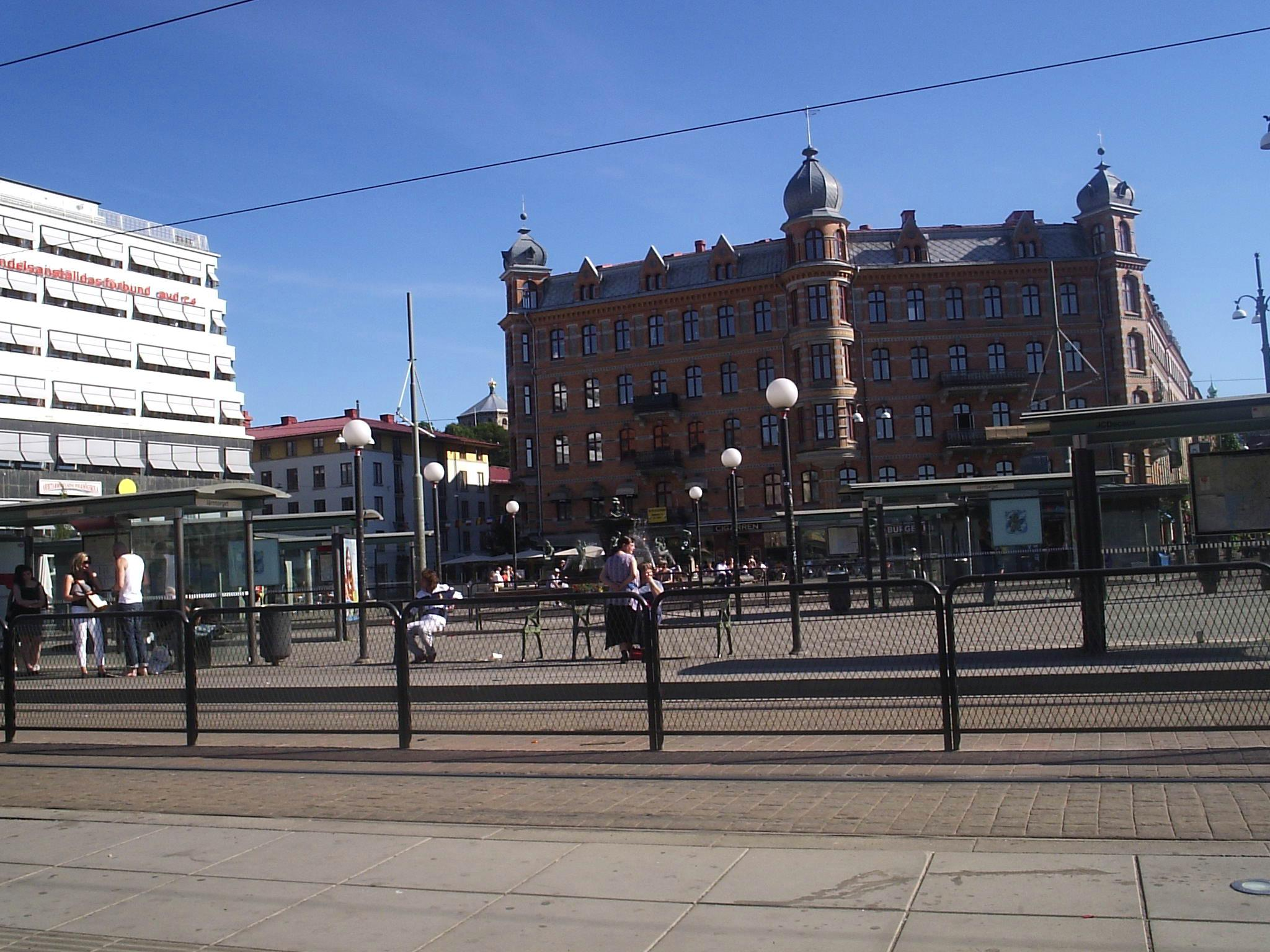
Järntorget to the south with the small-scale buildings of Haga in the left (southeast) corner and the broad street of Linnégatan on the right (southwest) corner

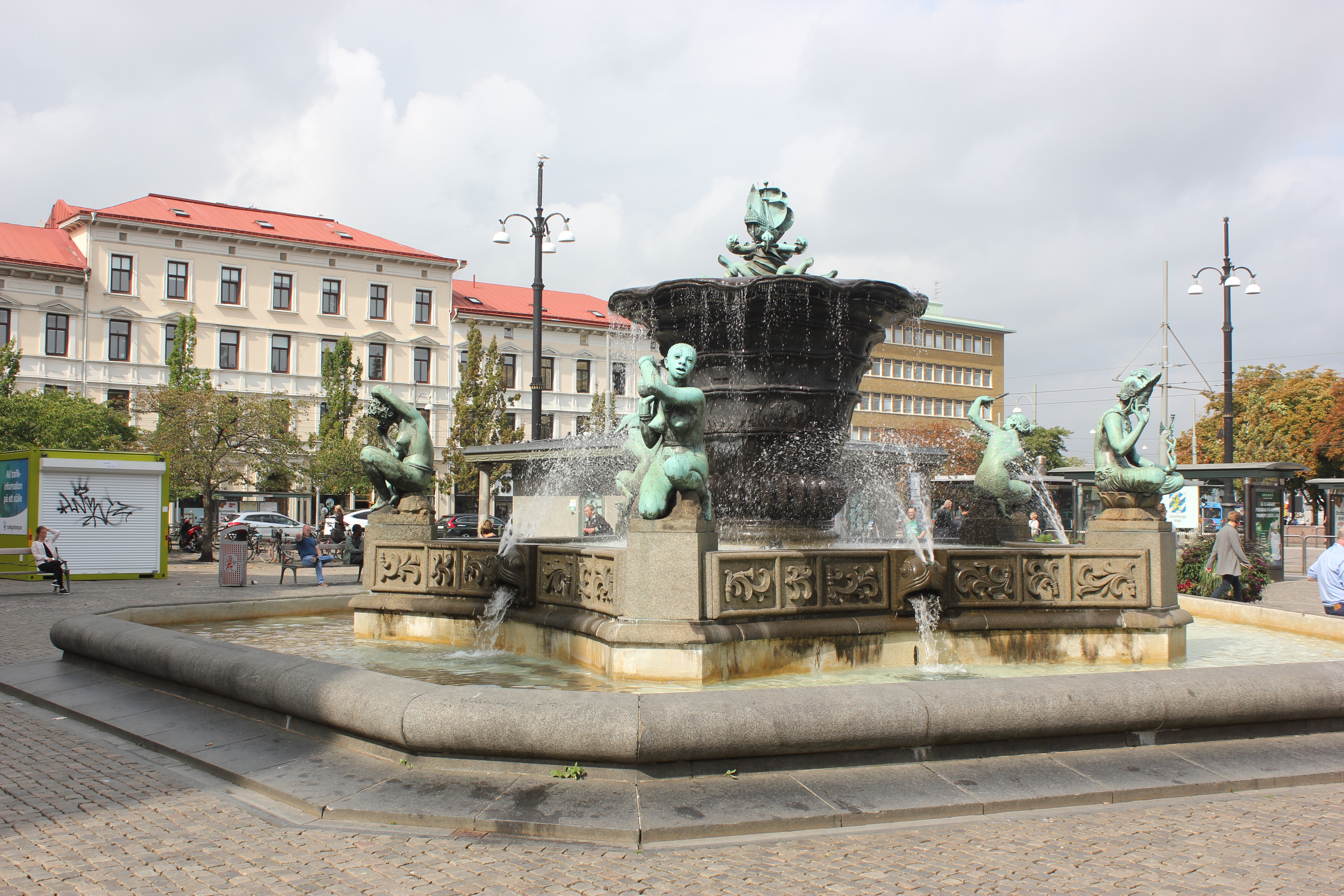
De fem världsdelarna by Tore Strindberg (1927)

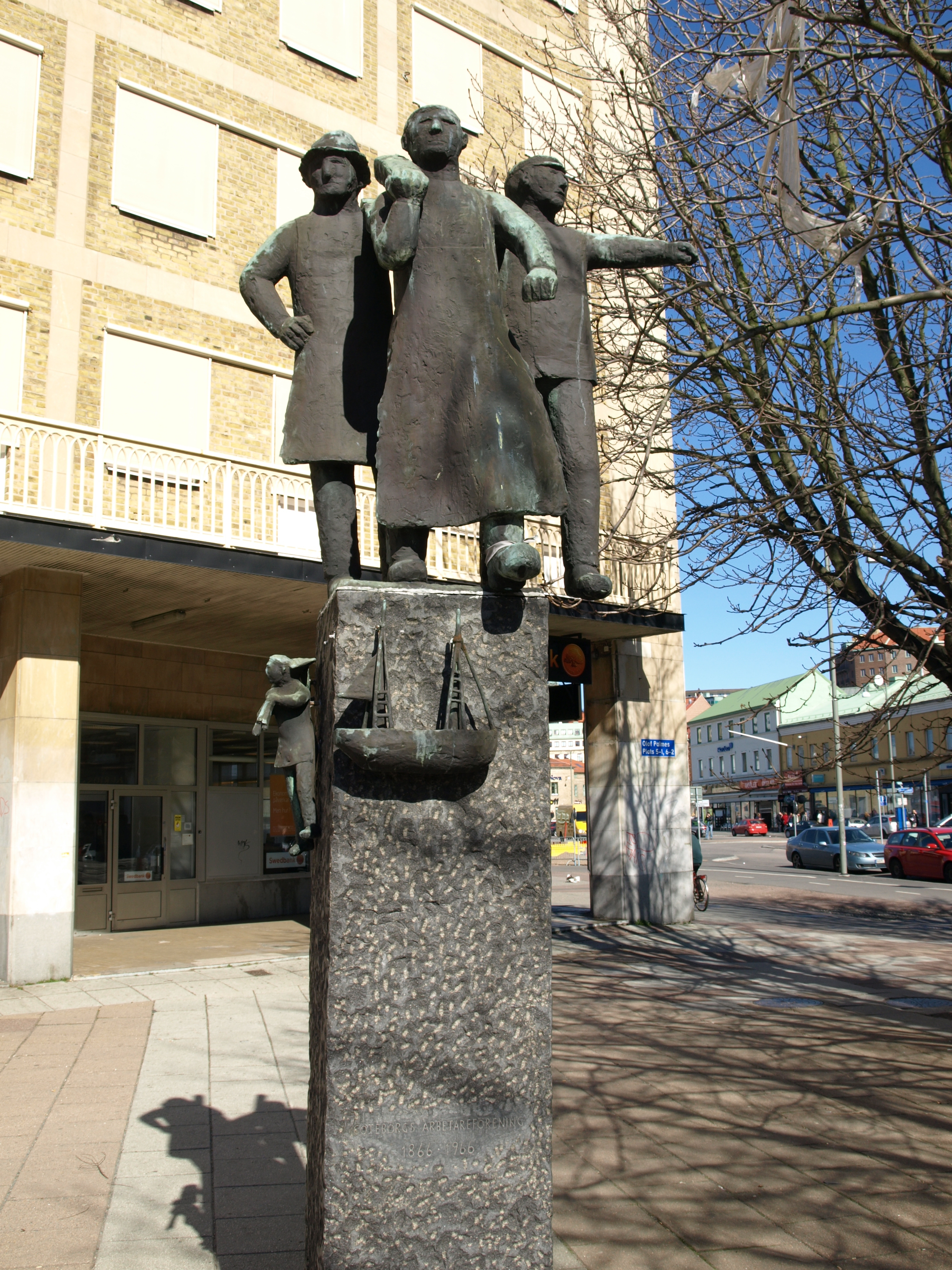
Järnbärare, bronze sculpture of ironncarriers by Sven Lundqvist (1966)

Järntorget is a public square in Gothenburg, Sweden. A hub for public transport (see Gothenburg tram system), it is located west of Haga and is the starting point for the boulevards of Linnégatan to the south and Nya Allén to the east; and the streets of Första Långgatan and Andra Långgatan to the west. Järntorget is the traditional home of the city's labour movement, with the Social Democratic Party, ABF, Folkteatern, Folkets hus and trade unions located here.

Järntorget ("The Iron Square") was named after the now-demolished scale which once stood on the site. It was used for weighing iron to be exported from the city's harbour. The former site of the scale is now occupied by a large, granite fountain called De fem världsdelarna. The fountain includes sculptures featuring five bronze naked, female figures representing five continents: Africa, America, Asia, Europe and Oceania. The fountain and the sculptures were the work of Swedish sculptor Tore Strindberg (1882–1968). The plinth in the centre of the fountain is decorated with the stamps which were used by the large number of Swedish iron merchants which once traded in the city. The fountain was first erected in 1927 and has been moved twice since then.

== Related reading ==
- Sjöblom, Axel (1945) Tore Strindberg: studie (Stockholm: Fritzes hovbokh)
