= Revolutionary Communist Youth (Sweden) =

Youth wing of the Swedish Communist Party

Revolutionary Communist Youth Revolutionär Kommunistisk Ungdom
- Chairperson: Marcus McBay
- Founded: 1994
- Headquarters: Fjärde Långgatan 8B, Gothenburg
- Ideology: Communism; Marxism-Leninism
- Mother party: Communist Party
- Website: www.rku.nu

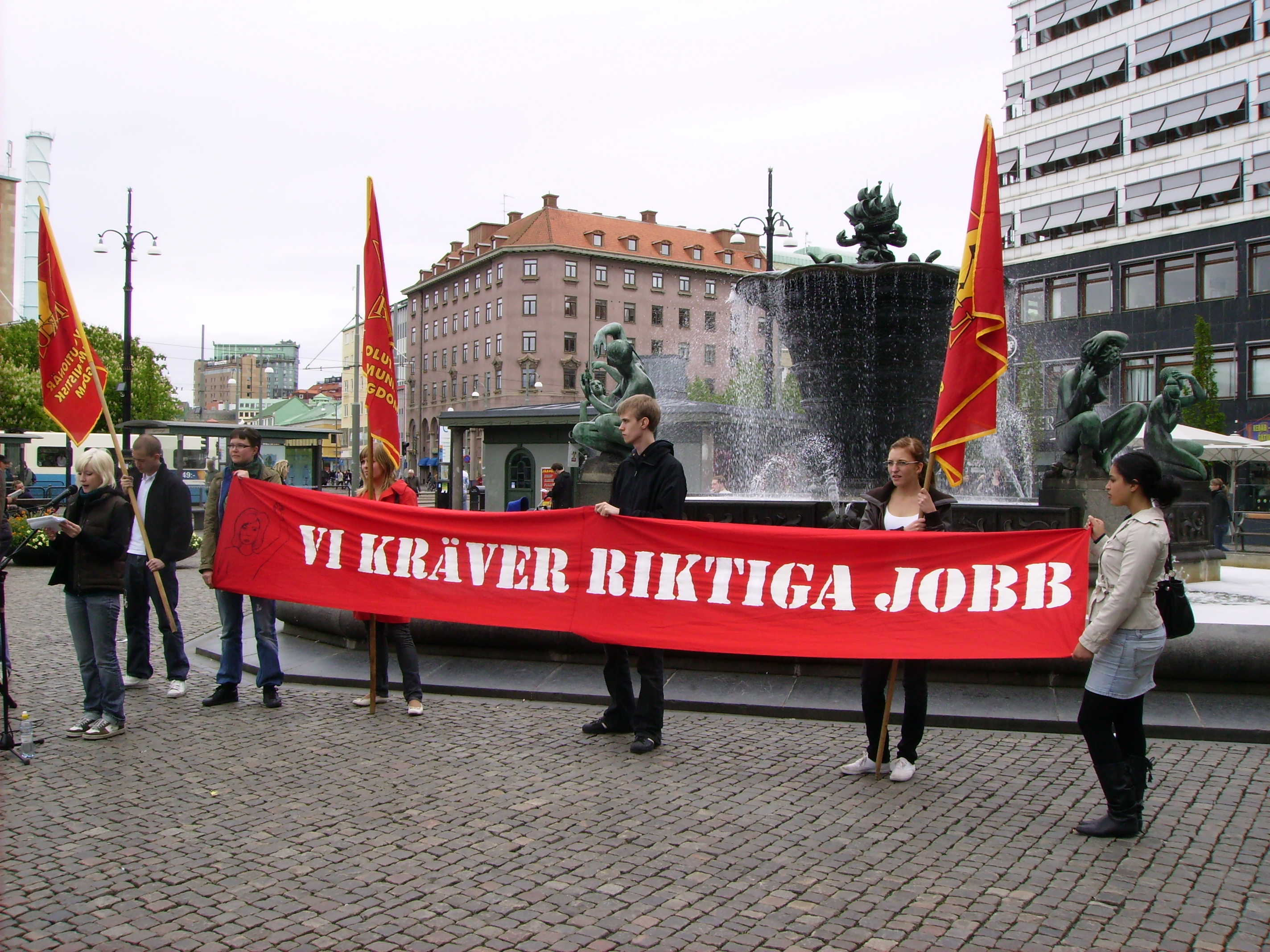
RKU in protest against youth unemployment in Järntorget, Gothenburg. The banner reads "We demand real jobs".

The Revolutionary Communist Youth (Swedish: Revolutionär Kommunistisk Ungdom, RKU) is the youth wing of the Swedish Communist Party. It was founded in 1994 as a successor of the Young Communist League of Sweden (marxist-leninists), which existed 1972-1978. RKU publishes a magazine called Rebell.

The organization participates at the World Festivals of Youth and Students, arranged by the World Federation of Democratic Youth.

== Politics ==
The organization believes that capitalist society is not capable of satisfying the needs of the people. RKU believes that there are clear examples of capitalism's failure in Sweden, with high unemployment and worsening education system, while large corporations make billions in profits.

RKU believes that the only long-term solution to the problems of capitalism is a violent revolutionary rearrangement of society at large, and the construction of a new socialist society, where production will be organised from people's needs. RKU emphasizes that the envisioned socialist society must be democratic and controlled by the working class.

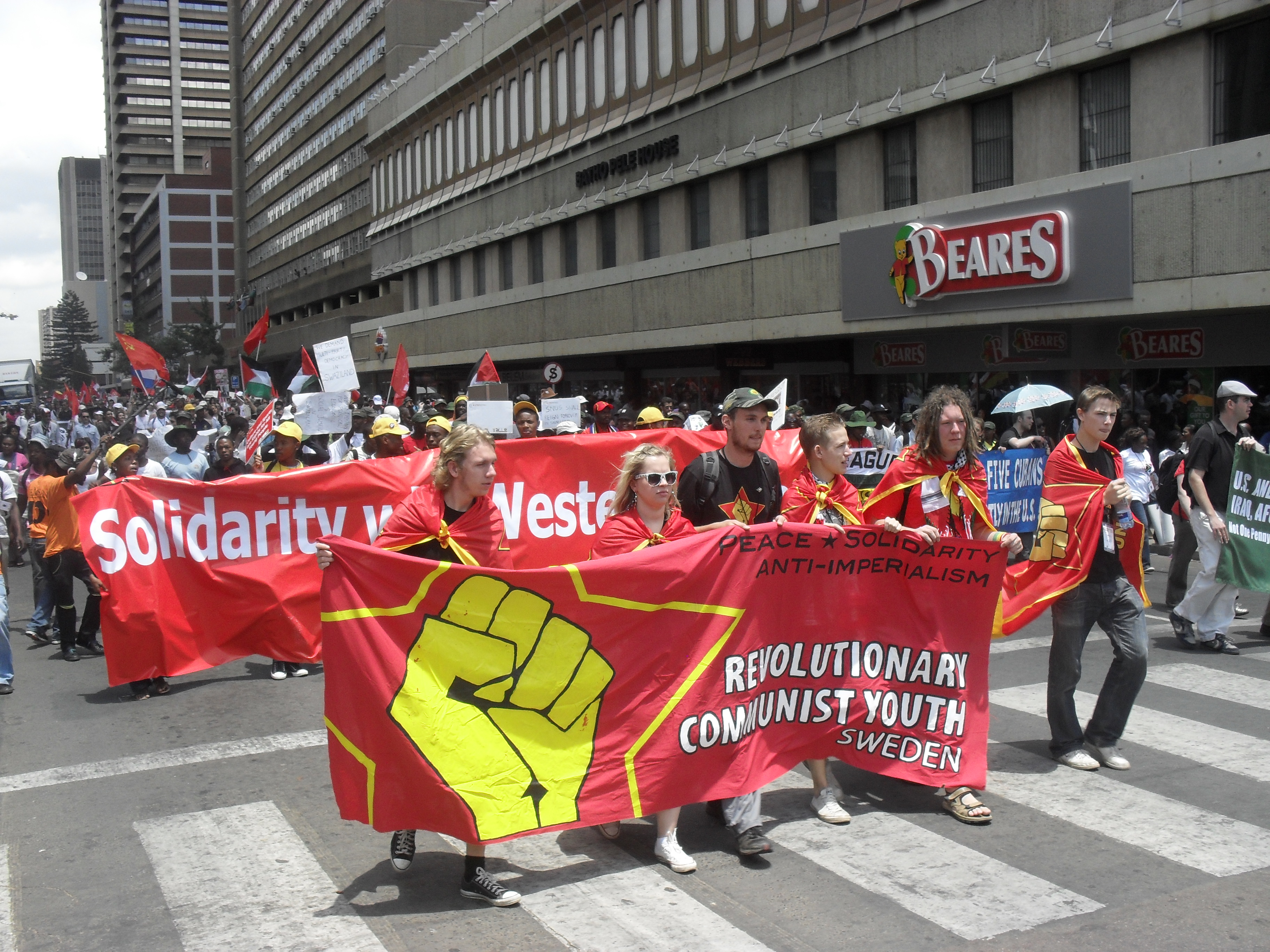
RKU at the World Festivals of Youth and Students in Pretoria 2010.

== Rebell ==
Rebell is a Swedish youth magazine published by the Revolutionary Communist Youth. It was founded in 1994.
