= Chilekommittén =

Chilekommittén symbol

Chilekommittén ('Chile Committee') was an organization in Sweden, dedicated to solidarity work with Chile. Chilekommittén was a non-partisan socialist and anti-imperialist movement. As of 1977 the organization had 110 local groups across the country, out of which 38 where found in Stockholm. Stieg Larsson estimated that some 35,000 persons were members of Chilekommittén at some point of its history. The Committee published Chile-bulletinen ('The Chile Bulletin').

== Early history ==
The organization was founded in 1971, as the Swedish Solidarity Committee for the Popular Front Government in Chile (Swedish: Svenska Solidaritetskommittén för Folkfrontsregeringen i Chile). The organization conducted advocacy in support of the reforms of Salvador Allende's Unidad Popular government. The founding nucleus of the Committee consisted of Latin Americans, Spaniards and a handful of Swedes. A few months later, the membership of the Committee was predominantly Swedish. The Committee met at Club de los Cronopios, an association of Spanish republican émigrés. Throughout 1972 the Committee campaigned in favour of the nationalization of copper mines in Chile.

== 1973 coup ==
Prior to the 1973 coup d'état in Chile, Chile-bulletinen presented an optimistic viewpoint of the possibilities to achieve socialism in Chile. The rumours about an impending coup d'état against Allende were discussed, however. In the immediate aftermath of the coup d'état Chile-bulletinen argued that the coup was a product of the reforms of the Allende government, and that it had been an error on behalf of the government to rely on alliances with middle-class sectors as opposed to empowering the most downtrodden strata. Just before the coup, Chilekommittén had hundreds of activists in local groups across the country. In reaction to the coup, the organization grew rapidly. Within a month Chilekommittén counted 70 local groups.

The first congress of Chilekommittén was held in December 1973, with 60 local groups represented. The same month, Sweden's Ambassador to Chile, Harald Edelstam, was declared persona non grata due to his humanitarian actions.

== Refugees ==
Chilekommittén campaigned for the right of asylum for Chilean refugees in Sweden, with protests at the Immigration Authority, Arlanda Airport, hunger strikes, etc.. The lawyer Hans Göran Franck in particular aided many refugees to obtain asylum status.

Chilean exiles, albeit remaining a minority within the movement, joined Chilekommittén in significant numbers. Amongst the Chilean members were several sympathizers of MIR.

== Political prisoners ==
Immediately after the 1973 coup, Chilekommittén began to mobilize support for political prisoners in Chile. A working group of prisoners issues was set up. The working group gathered information about the situation of political prisoners. Through the prisoners' working group, local groups of Chilekommittén and local trade unions were assigned to follow the cases of individual prisoners, writing letters of to the Chilean judiciary and media.

== Boycott campaigns ==
In response to a request from the Chilean trade union centre CUT, Chilekommittén propagated boycotts of Chilean imports, arguing that trade with Chile strengthened the military junta. Chilekommittén also opposed economic activities of Swedish corporations in Chile.

== Fundraising ==
Chilekommittén supported Chilean left-wing parties and trade union with economical support. The organization also funded some social and educational projects in poor urban areas in Chile.

== Cultural activities ==
Chilekommittén organized many cultural events, Chile-bullentinen often carried reports about how Chilean exiles sang songs at the meetings of the movement. The organization published books and organized concerts and theatre performances. In 1974 the Committee issued an album by Jan Hammarlund, interpreting songs of Violetta Parra.

== Political profile ==
In some ways the work of Chilekommittén canalized some of the activism that had been manifested in the United NLF Groups (FNL-grupperna). The Vietnam solidarity movement had a deep impact in Swedish society, but once the United States signed a peace treaty and retreated from the war some of the Swedish Vietnam activists would join Chilekommittén instead. However, the solidarity activism for Chile never reached the same magnitude at the Vietnam solidarity movement. The organizational set-up and profile of Chilekommittén mimicked FNL-grupperna, but Chilekommittén criticized the hegemony of the Communist Party of Sweden (SKP) in the latter.

Within Chilekommittén different political tendencies cohabited. At the first congress of the organization, two tendencies were present; the Left Party-Communists/Communist Youth (VPK/KU) and the Revolutionary Marxist League (RMF, later renamed Communist Workers League, KAF). Some members of SKP were also present (SKP did, however, not endorse Chilekommittén and would later launch their own movement for support to the Chilean Revolutionary Communist Party and its Popular Front). As of the mid-1970s, the main political tendencies in Chilekommittén were VPK, KAF and Förbundet KOMMUNIST (which supported the Chilean MIR). There was also a presence of Förbundet Arbetarmakt.

== Links with other solidarity movements ==
In 1974 Chilekommittén, FNL-grupperna, the Stockholm Africa Group, the Palestine Group in Stockholm and the Swedish-Cuban Association organized a joint anti-imperialist campaign week. The campaign week carried the slogan 'Chile - Angola - Palestine - Vietnam, same enemy, same struggle!'.

In June 1975 a European Conference to Boycott the Military Dictatorship in Chile was organized by Chilekommittén in Stockholm, with participation of solidarity movements across Europe.

Towards the end of the 1970s the organization began to engage in advocacy work regarding the situation in Argentina, El Salvador and Nicaragua. During the end of the 70s and the 80s, they stablished a strong collaboration with different Chilean associations in Sweden, due to the high number of refugees.

== 1975 Båstad match protests ==
Chilekommittén mobilized protests against the Davis Cup match in Båstad in 1975, when Sweden played against Chile. The call for the protest was issued on July 30, 1975. The slogan of the protests was Stoppa Matchen! ('Stop the match'). Thousands of people took part in the protest. Hundreds of balloons, with names of political prisoners were released in the vicinity of the match venue. Through Chilean sports commentators on site, news about the protests reached Chile. A special issue of Chile-bulletinen was produced for the protests, with 20,000 copies.

== IDB protests ==
The 1976 parliamentary election in Sweden was won by the centre-right coalition. After the election, the new government applied for Swedish membership in the Inter-American Development Bank (IDB, a US-linked institution that had reduced aid during the Allende government, and increased funding to Chile after the coup). Chilekommittén initiated a campaign against Swedish IDB membership. The appeal of Chilekommittén was signed by the People's Party Youth League, the Centre Party Youth and the Communist Youth. The Swedish Social Democratic Youth League issued a separate protest of their own.

== 1976 Nobel Prize in Economics protests ==
The organization protested against the awarding of the 1976 Nobel Memorial Prize in Economic Sciences to Milton Friedman. In the discourse of the organization, Friedman was tied to the military junta in Chile. A press conference was organized and a protest mobilized in Stockholm on the eve of the prize ceremony. Forty organizations backed the protests against the awarding of the prize to Friedman.

== Dissolution ==
In response to the democratization process taking place in Chile, Chilekommittén was dissolved in 1991. The decision to disband the organization was made at an annual assembly in September 1991. The assembly decided that all assets of the organization would be transferred to political prisoners and human rights organizations in Chile.
