= Båstad riots =

1968 Swedish riots and demonstrations against Rhodesian participation in the Davis Cup

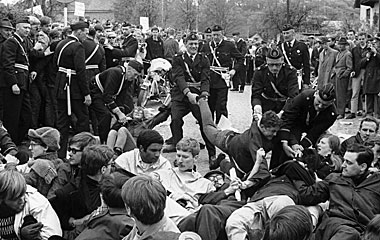
Police action in connection with the 1968 Båstad riots.

The Båstad riots (Swedish: Båstadskravallerna) is the name given to the riots that took place during a Davis Cup tennis match between Sweden and Rhodesia on 3 May 1968 in Båstad, Sweden.

Demonstrators were protesting the participation of the apartheid practicing country of South Africa, and white minority ruled Rhodesia, in the international tennis competition. The countries were barred from other international sporting events. It became the most violent confrontation between the Swedish police and demonstrators during the 1960s. It was followed by a dialogue between the Swedish government and the demonstrators to curb the escalation of violence. The match later was played in secrecy, and Sweden won 4-1.
