= Proletären =

Communist newspaper in Sweden

- Proletärer i alla länder, förena er (English: Proletarians of all countries, unite)

- Front page of 10 September 2021.
- Type: Weekly newspaper
- Owner: Communist Party
- Publisher: Communist Party
- Editor-in-chief: August Eliasson
- Founded: 1970; 56 years ago
- Political alignment: Marxist-Leninist
- Language: Swedish
- Headquarters: Fjärde Långgatan 8B, Gothenburg
- Country: Sweden
- Circulation: 3,200 (as of 2013)
- ISSN: 0345-9578
- OCLC number: 643465774
- Website: proletaren.se

Proletären (meaning "the proletarian"; in full Marxist-leninist Proletären) is a Swedish Marxist-Leninist weekly newspaper published by the Communist Party.

== History and profile ==
Proletären was founded in 1970. About a third of the paper is sold in the streets.

Many notable Swedes, such as Jan Myrdal, Peter Birro, and Sven Wollter (who was a member of the Communist Party), have had their articles published in Proletären.

Proletären had a circulation of 3,200 copies in 2013.

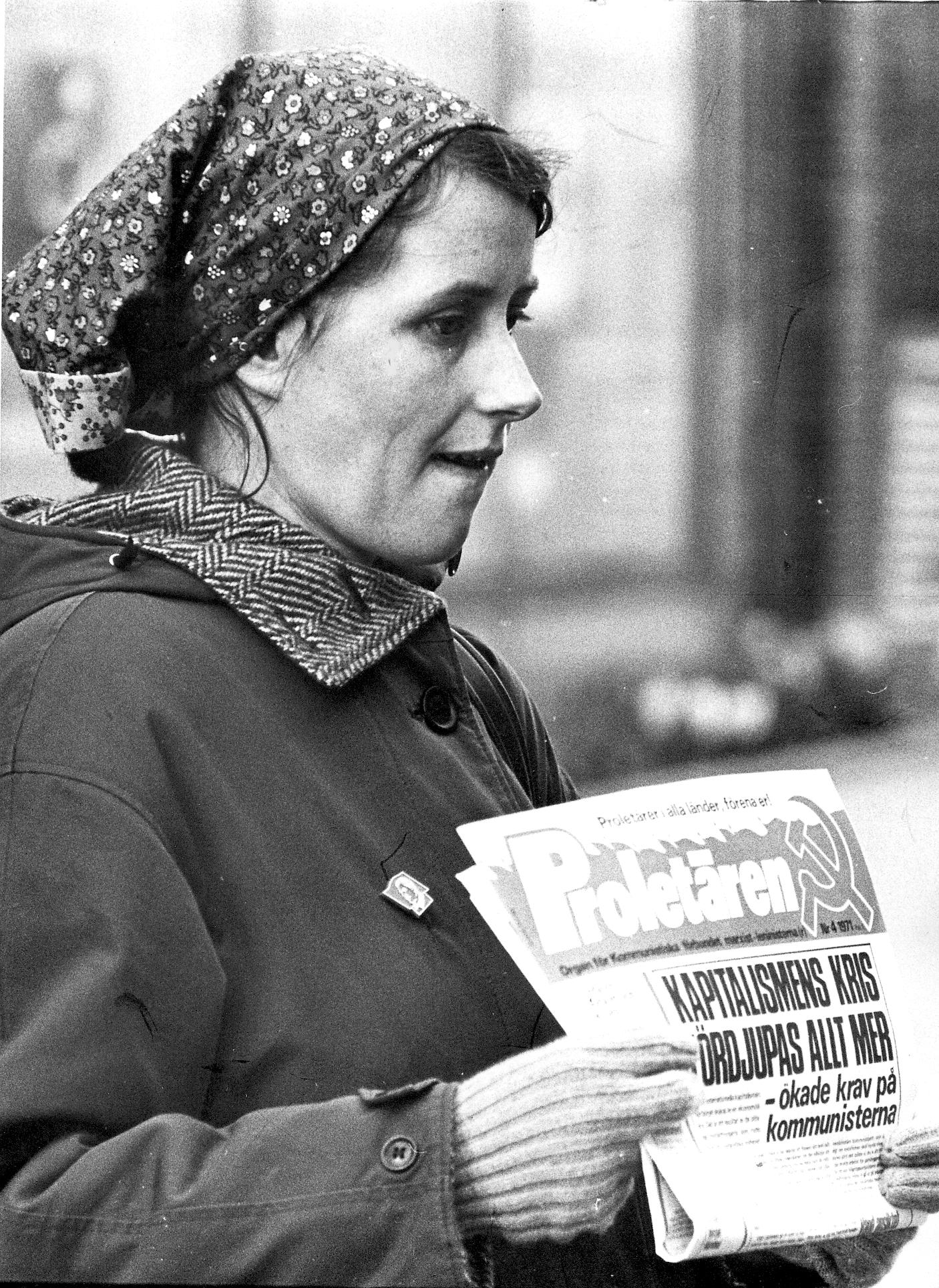
Proletären is sold in the streets of Gothenburg, April 1971.

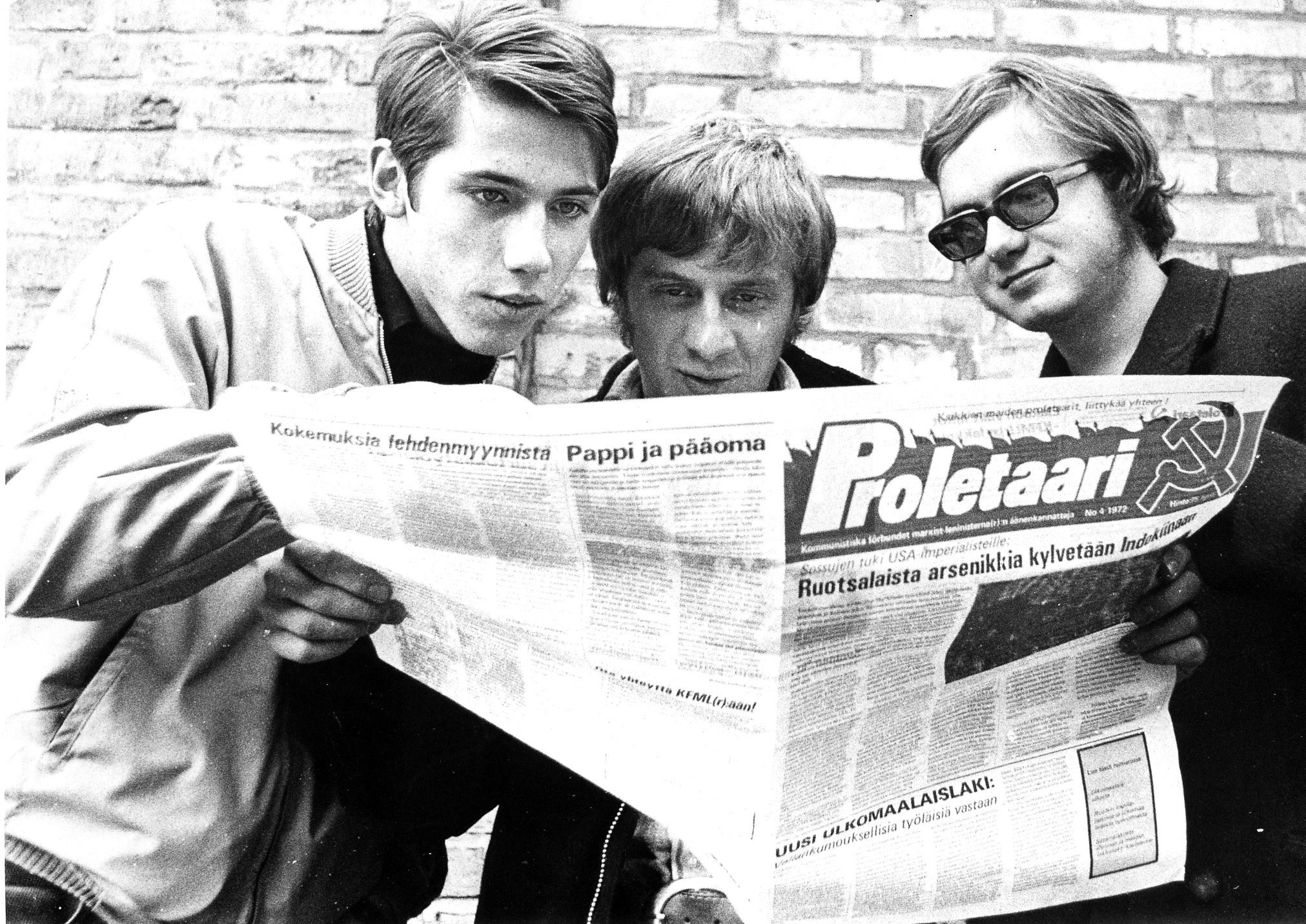
Finnish workers reading Proletären in Finnish (Proletaari) 1972.

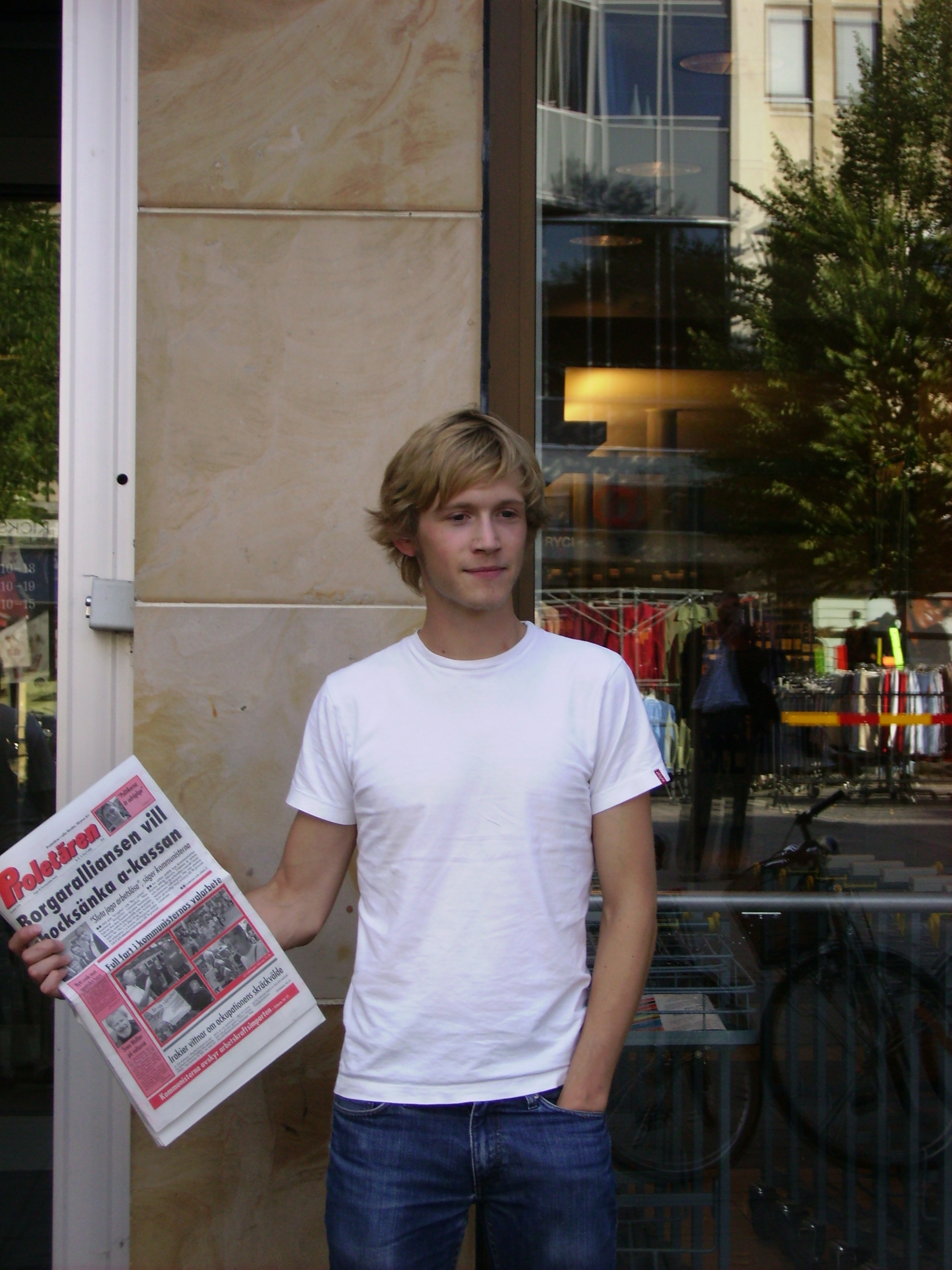
Proletären salesman in Örebro, September 2005.

Proletären saleswoman in Örebro, September 2011.

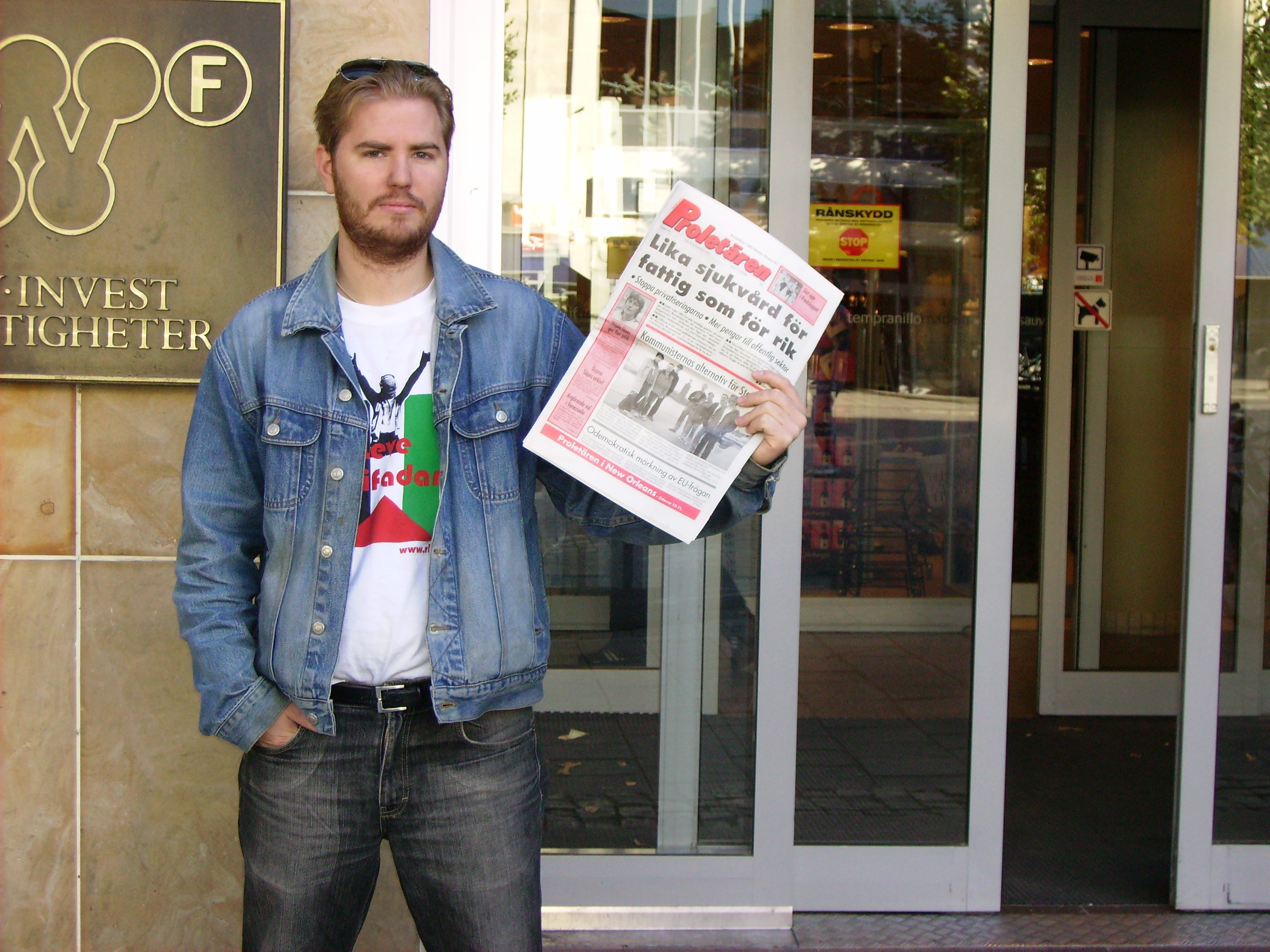
A man holding a Proletären newspaper in 2005

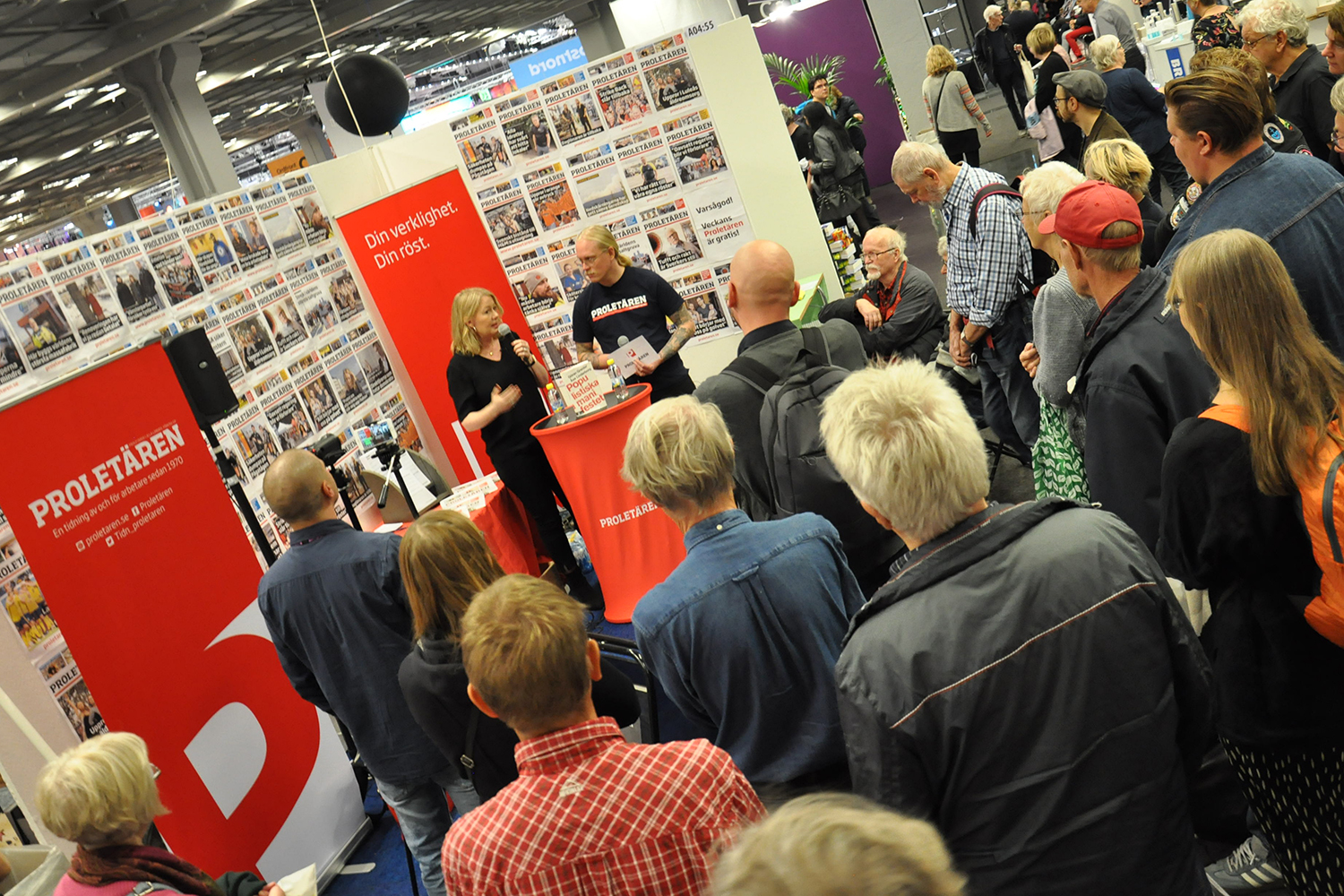
Proletären at the 2018 Gothenburg Book Fair.

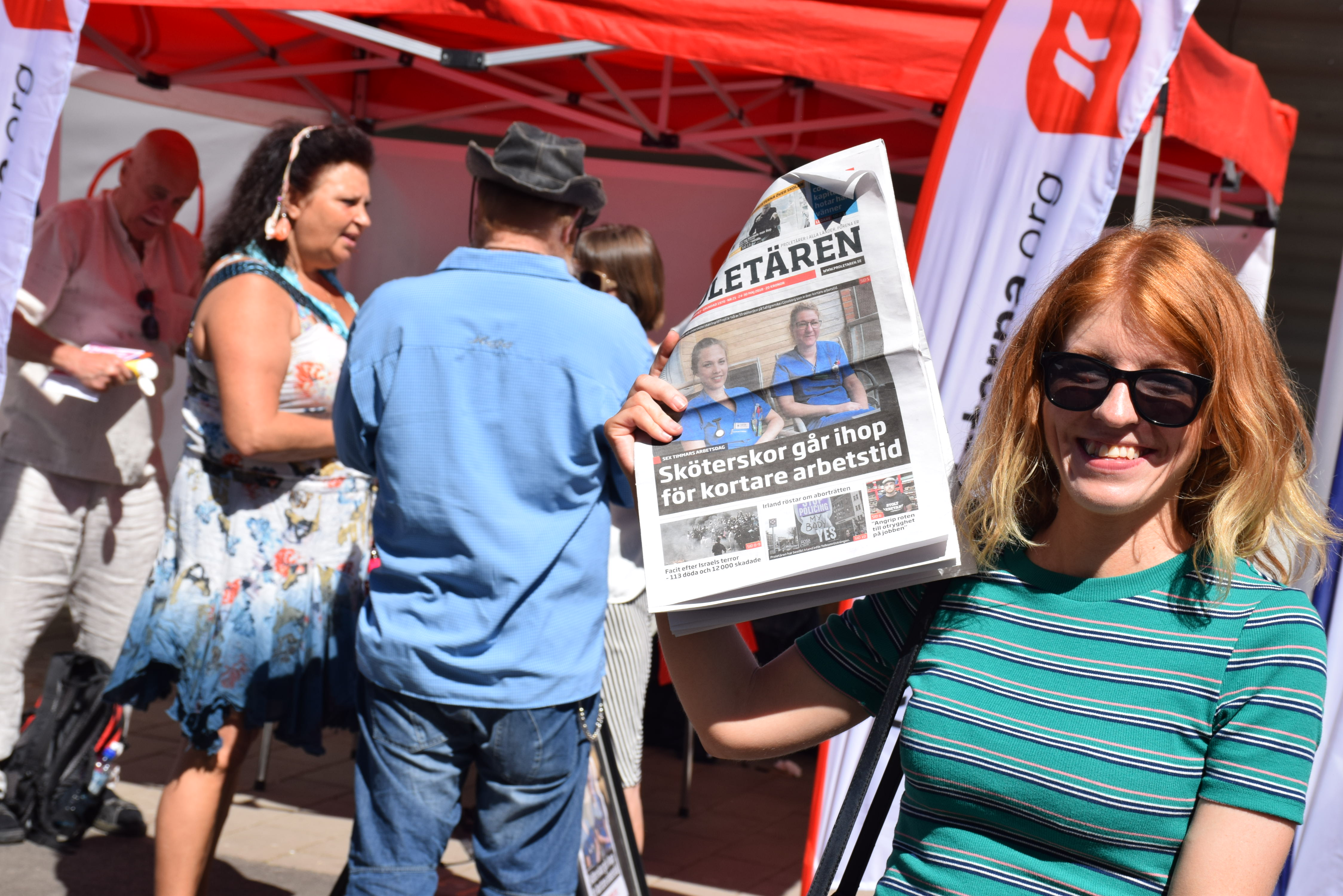
A woman with a Proletären newspaper with a stand used by the Communist Party during the Hammarkullekarnevalen in 2018.

Logo

== See also ==
- Proletarian
