= List of sovereign states by homeless population =

It has been estimated that 318 million people are homeless worldwide. Habitat for Humanity estimated in 2016 that 1.6 billion people around the world live in "inadequate shelter".

Different countries often use different definitions of homelessness. It can be defined by living in a shelter, being in a transitional phase of housing and living in a place not fit for human habitation. The numbers may or may not take into account internal displacement from conflict, violence and natural disasters. Also, they may or may not take into account chronic and transitional homelessness, making direct comparisons of numbers complicated.

== List ==
Country	Homeless (average day)	Data year	Homeless per 10,000	Unsheltered per 10,000	Main article, other notes
Afghanistan	360,000	2023	87.6		
Albania	32,000	2020	113		
Algeria	15,000	2008	4.3		Homelessness in Algeria The figure consists of children only.
Argentina	3,600,000	2020	793		
Australia	122,494	2021	48.0		Homelessness in Australia
Austria	19,912	2020	22.3		
Azerbaijan	50,000	2017	50.7		
Bangladesh	5,000,000	2019	307		
Belgium	13,524	2021	11.7		
Benin	100,000	2010	106		
Bhutan	0 (claim)	2021	0	20	
Brazil	281,000	2022	6.5		
Burkina Faso	700,000	2020	335		
Cambodia	3,000	2020	1.8		
Cameroon	200,000	2020	75.5		
Canada	118,329	2023	29.02		Homelessness in Canada
Central African Republic	28,000	2019	53.8		
Chile	14,013	2019	7.0		
China	2,579,000	2011	19.2		Homelessness in China
Colombia	662,146	2020	130		
Costa Rica	3,387	2020	7.0		
Croatia	2,000	2020	4.9		
Czech Republic	23,830	2019	22.0		
Denmark	5,789	2022	9.8		Homelessness in Denmark
Dominican Republic	296,591	2020	270		
DR Congo	1,500,000	2018	172		
Egypt	2,000,000	2020	186		Homelessness in Egypt
Estonia	1,068	2021	8.0		
Ethiopia	600,000	2023	47.4		The figure consists of children and teenagers only.
Finland	4,114	2022	7.9	0.1	Homelessness in Finland
France	330,000	2022	48.7	4.5	Homelessness in France
Germany	262,600	2022	31.4		Homelessness in Germany
Ghana	100,000	2020	32.9		
Greece	40,000	2016	37.1		Homelessness in Greece
Grenada	68	2011	6.4	6.4	Homeless in national census seems to mean unsheltered. High variance after hurricanes.
Guatemala	475,000	2012	315		
Haiti	310,000	2024	261		
Honduras	150,000	2020	148		
Hungary	6,944	2022	7.2		Homelessness in Hungary
Iceland	349	2017	10.0		
India	1,770,000	2011	12.6		Homelessness in India
Indonesia	122,000	2023	4.5		Homelessness in Indonesia
Iran	130,000	2022	14.8		
Iraq	2,000,000	2014	544		
Ireland	13,540	2024	16.0		Homelessness in Ireland
Israel	3,471	2020	4.0		Homelessness in Israel
Italy	96,197	2021	16.29		
Japan	2,820	2024	0.2		Homelessness in Japan
Jordan	0 (claim)	2017	0		
Kazakhstan	5,500	2020	0.6		
Kenya	20,095	2019	3.9		
Latvia	5,644	2021	35.3		
Libya	40,000	2023	58.1		
Liechtenstein	0 (claim)	2004	0		
Lithuania	4,009	2021	14.1		
Luxembourg	696	2022	10.8		
Mali	260,000	2012	157		
Malta	236	2022	4.6		
Mexico	5,778	2020			
Morocco	380,000	2023	100		
Mozambique	640,000	2023	189		
Myanmar	1,500,000	2023	275		
Nepal	2,500,000	2023	809		
Netherlands	32,000	2021	18.0		Homelessness in the Netherlands
New Zealand	102,123	2018	217	7.5	Homelessness in New Zealand
Nigeria	4,500,000	2022	206		Internally displaced, per IDMC.
Norway	3,325	2020	6.2		
Pakistan	198,288	2023	331		
Peru	700,000	2017	223		
Philippines	4,500,000	2018	424		Street children in the Philippines
Poland	30,330	2019	8.0		
Portugal	9,604	2021	8.0	3.3	Homelessness in Portugal
Romania	2,976	2017	7.0		
Russia	11,285 (claim)	2021	0.8		Homelessness in Russia
Serbia	20,000	2017	28.5		
Singapore	1,036	2021	1.9		
Slovakia	10,661	2020	19.5		
Slovenia	1,047	2020	5.0		
Somalia	1,400,000	2023	772		
South Africa	55,719	2022	9.0		Homelessness in South Africa
South Korea	8,986	2022	1.7		
South Sudan	32,000	2021	29.8		
Spain	28,552	2022	5.9		Homelessness in Spain
Sri Lanka	800,000	2021	361		
Sudan	3,000,000	2023	624		
Sweden	27,383	2023	25.9		Homelessness in Sweden
Switzerland	2,200	2022	2.5		Homelessness in Switzerland
Syria	5,300,000	2023	2,302		
Thailand	2,499	2023	0.3		
Togo	15,000	2022	17.4		
Uganda	4,016,980	2015	1,125		
Ukraine	20,000	2023	5.4		
United Kingdom	380,000	2023	56.1	0.9	Homelessness in the United Kingdom
United States	653,104	2023	19.5	12	Homelessness in the United States
Vatican City	0 (claim)	2015	0		A shelter supported by the Holy See accommodates up to 30 homeless people in Rome.
Yemen	300,000	2020	92.9		
Zambia	400,000	2023	194		
Zimbabwe	1,200,000	2013	848		

== Dependent territories ==
Statistics on homelessness (and other social issues) in dependent territories are often integrated into those for the nation-states to which they are related. However, territories with significant populations often compile their statistics or generate news on homelessness. For example, in Hong Kong in 2017, media reports indicated that 1,800 people were homeless, with the problem mainly attributed to high costs of living.

== See also ==
- List of countries by home ownership rate
