= Street children in India =

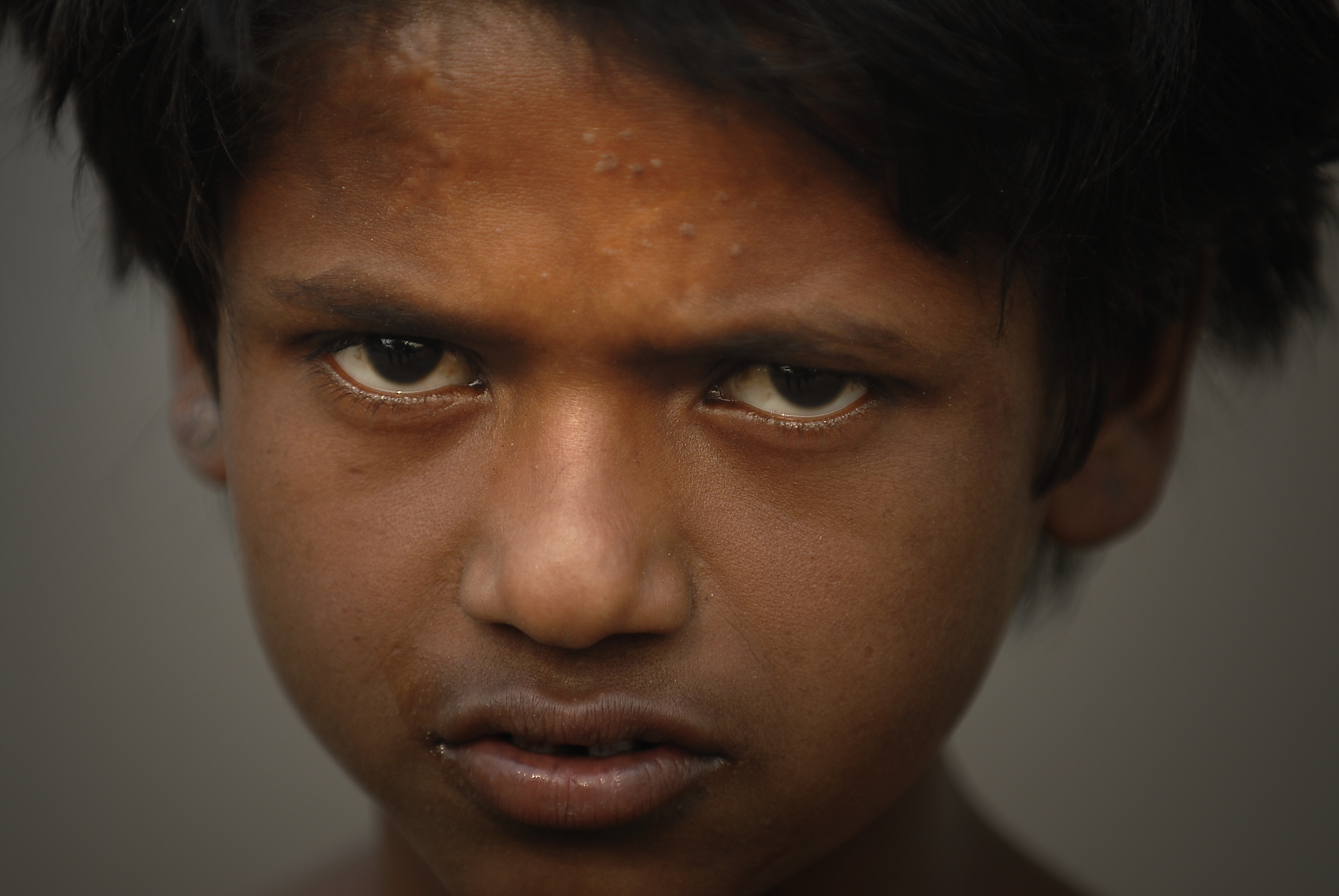
A street child in New Delhi

India has an estimated one hundred thousand or more street children in each of the following cities: New Delhi, Kolkata, and Mumbai. Mainly because of family conflict, they come to live on the streets and take on the full responsibilities of caring for themselves, including working to provide for and protecting themselves. Though street children do sometimes band together for greater security, they are often exploited by employers and the police.

Their many vulnerabilities require specific legislation and attention from the government and other organisations to improve their condition.

== Definition clarification ==
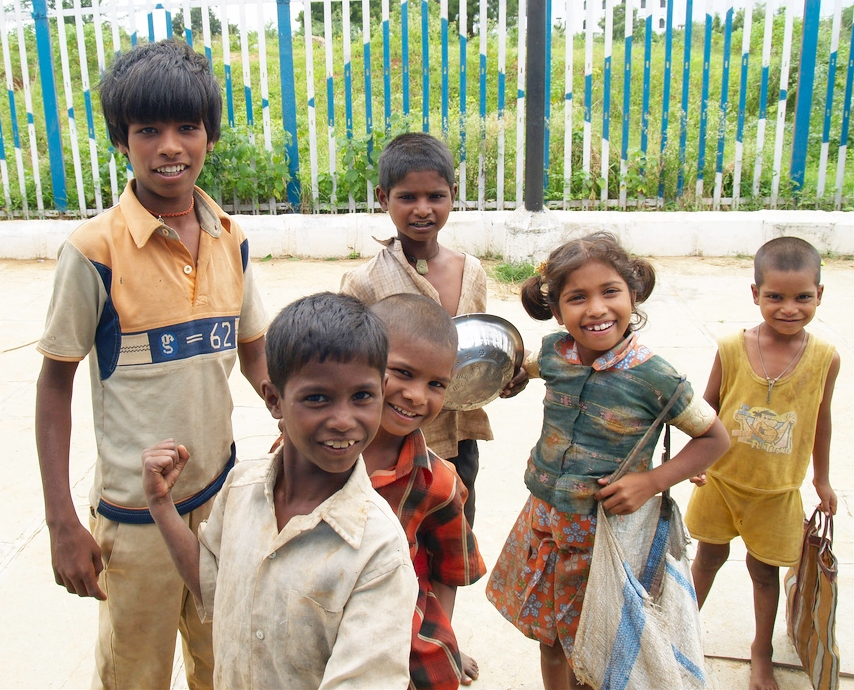
Street children at a railway station in Medak district, Telangana (then Andhra Pradesh)

In the early years of research on street children, the term "street child" included any child that worked on the street. From research, however, different categories of children on the streets have been distinguished, while still recognizing that children's complex experiences are difficult to define. Mark W. Lusk, a prominent researcher of street children, developed four categories of children on the street from his research: children who work on the street but return to their families at night, children who work on the street but whose family ties are dwindling, children who live and work with their families on the street, and children who work and live on their own on the street.

The term "street child" has come to refer only to the last group. UNICEF defines a street child as, "...any girl or boy ... for whom the street (in the widest sense of the word, including unoccupied dwellings, wasteland, etc.) has become his or her habitual abode and/or source of livelihood; and who is inadequately protected, supervised, or directed by responsible adults". It is important to distinguish the group of children that live on their own on the streets because their lives vary greatly from those of children who simply work on the streets; they thus have different needs and require targeted attention.

While 18 million children work on the streets of India, it is estimated that only 5–20 percent of them are truly homeless and disconnected from their families. Because the street children in India have unique vulnerabilities – the amount of time they spend on the street, their livelihood depending on the street, and their lack of protection and care from adults – they are a subgroup of the Indian population that deserve specific attention in order to ensure that their needs are known. As the most vulnerable group of children in India according to UNICEF, they need to be understood as much as possible.

== Characteristics ==
It is difficult to obtain accurate data about them because of their floating character. Street children usually have no proof of identification and move often. Of the 50,000 people in India that are officially reported as leaving home annually, 45 percent are under 16; this number, though, is likely very low. Various studies have formulated estimates of certain cities. In the late 1980s, for instance, it was estimated that there were at least 100,000 street children in both Calcutta and Bombay. Overall, estimates for the total number of street children in India range from 400,000 to 800,000.

=== Age ===
Because it is difficult to obtain precise and accurate statistics about street children, information about their ages is approximate. Most of the street children in India are over 6, and the majority is over 8. The mean age of street children in a National Institute of Urban Affairs study in 1989 was 13 years. Another study in 1989 by UNICEF found that 72 percent of the street children studied were ages 6–12 and 13 percent were under 6 years of age.

=== Gender ===
The majority of street children in India are boys with little or no education.

== Causes ==
The street children in India choose to leave their families and homes for strategic reasons. Three hypotheses have been put forth in an attempt to explain their choices: urban poverty, aberrant families, and urbanization. Evidence can to some degree support all three of these hypotheses. In one study of 1,000 street children living in Bombay conducted in 1990, 39.1 percent of street children said they left home because of problems and fights with family, 20.9 percent said they left because of family poverty, and 3.6 percent said that they wanted to see the city. The street children and children running away from home are connected. A child running away from home ends up on the street in most situations. There is a lot of data available on why children run away, revealing many reasons for doing so. Some reasons are simple, and some are complex. Sometimes the reasons are because of the child's behavior, and other times the parents are the cause. A child not going to school or not doing homework and thus fearing beatings, is a very common cause. A child stealing money or fighting with siblings are reasons too.

Most children leave their families to live on the street because of family problems. Family problems include such things as death of a parent, alcoholism of the father, strained relationships with stepparents, parent separation, abuse, and family violence. Additionally, street children usually come from female-headed households.

Most children who leave home to live on the streets come from slums or low cost housing, both of which are areas of high illiteracy, drug use, and unemployment. Children usually transfer their lives to the streets through a gradual process; they may at first only stay on the street a night or two. Gradually they will spend more time away from home until they do not return.

Once on the streets, children sometimes find that their living conditions and physical and mental health are better than at home; however, this fact speaks to the poor conditions of their homes rather than good conditions in the street. Street conditions are far from child-friendly. Once they leave home, many street children move around often because of the fear that their relatives will find them and force them to return home. Many children are kidnapped and treated as slaves by the kidnappers. The kidnappers make them beg for money the whole day on the streets and enjoy themselves with the money they get from the children.

== Economic activity ==
=== Work ===
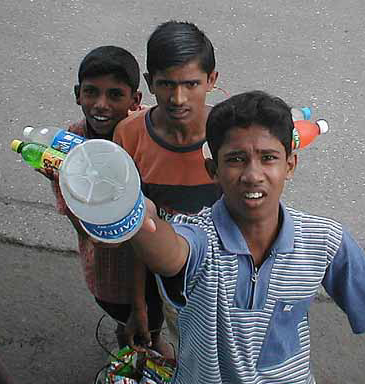
Street children in Mumbai, India, selling snacks and drinks to bus passengers

As street children must provide for themselves, work is a very important aspect of their lives. Working conditions for street children are often very poor because they are confined to working in the informal sector, which is unregulated by the government. In Bombay, 50,000 children are illegally employed by 11,750 hotels, restaurants, canteens, tea shops, and eating places. Because of street children's lack of protection from a family and the law, employers often exploit them, making them virtual prisoners, sometimes withholding pay, and abusing them. Employers that would not mistreat the children often will not hire them because they are seen as too great of a risk.

Because of the low pay from employers, street children in India often choose to be self-employed or work multiple jobs. In fact, the majority of them are self-employed. One of the most common economic activities done by the children is scavenging for recyclable materials, such as plastic, paper, and metal.

Other jobs include cleaning cars; petty vending, selling small items such as balloons or sweets; selling newspapers or flowers; begging; shining shoes; working in small hotels; working on construction sites; and working in roadside stalls or repair shops. Street children, especially the older children, are also sometimes engaged in activities such as stealing, pick-pocketing, drug-peddling, and prostitution, though this is a small proportion. Most of the street children work 8–10 hours total each day in their various economic activities.

=== Spending ===
The earnings of street children fluctuate greatly, but they usually only make enough for subsistence. Most street children in India earn between 200 ($4.00) and 830 rupees a month, with older children making more than younger children. Self-employed children also typically make more than children who are employed under an employer. The largest expense in a street child's budget is food, which often costs 5–10 rupees a day. In order to cut down on food expenses, many children drink tea to dull hunger.

The money street children earn that is not spent on food is usually quickly spent on other things because older children and police frequently steal their money. This lack of ability to save causes severe financial insecurity. While children occasionally send some of their earnings home to their families, they spend most of their extra money on entertainment.

Many street children spend 300 rupees a month on movies, though older children also use their money to buy cigarettes, chewing tobacco, alcohol, and drugs. Street children often spend very little on clothing because their employers often provide clothes for work or their families occasionally give them clothes if they know where they are living. Also, the boys among them do not mind wandering fully or partially naked in public because it adds to the people's sympathy for them.

== Education ==
The education of street children in India is very poor and often nonexistent. A study of street children in Bombay in 1989 found that 54.5 percent had never been enrolled in school and 66 percent of the children were illiterate. A 2004 study of street children in Bombay revealed that circumstances were largely the same: 60 percent of the children had never attended school and approximately two-thirds were illiterate.

Thirty percent had been to elementary school, while only 10 percent had been to middle or high school. In fact, many children in the 2004 study said that one of the reasons they ran away from home was because they did not want to be forced to work and were unable to attend school. Obviously, however, the demands of living alone make it very unlikely that they will be able to obtain education through leaving.

== Relationships and coping ==
The street children in India are especially vulnerable among low-income children because they do not have the support structures that other children normally have, namely families and the psychological and monetary support they offer. Thus, street children adopt strategies to cope with the harsh realities of their lives. For many, these strategies include developing a tough exterior and strong independence to hide their vulnerability. They live in survival-mode, constantly having to be aware of their surroundings and fight for their safety. These circumstances lead children to engage in behaviours that children in families typically do not, such as creating a new identity, using aggression frequently, and valuing relationships based on what can be gained from them.

While the majority of street children in India have been found to use positive coping mechanisms to deal with the stress of their lives, some choose maladaptive strategies, such as drinking alcohol, using drugs, and visiting prostitutes. When questioned about their substance use, many street children in Bombay reported that the cause was frustration concerning living on the street or conflicts in their family which caused them to leave home.

Street children are not entirely on their own. Many form groups with other street children to protect themselves. These groups normally have a leader and specific territory; though these groups bring safety to most, younger children are sometimes used by the leader to steal or do other illegal activities. Street children in Bombay report relying on their friends for help when they are sick, money when they run out, and information about work when they need a job. Street children spend much of their free time with their friends, often going with them to the movies.

Among the most important deprivations faced by street children is the lack of a protective and guiding adult, but some street children manage to find individuals to fulfil this role. Though most live on their own or with friends, some street children form connections with families that live on the streets or in slums and see these families as their substitute families. Many of these children find a "mother-figure" that cares for them when they are ill and is interested in their well-being.

== Health and nutrition ==
Street children in India face additional vulnerability because of their lack of access to nutritious food, sanitation, and medical care. Street children lack access to nutritious food because many are dependent on leftovers from small restaurants or hotels, food stalls, or garbage bins. In a study of street children in Bombay in 1990, 62.5 percent of the children obtained food from hotels.

In the same study of street children in Bombay, 29.6 percent of children reported bathing in the sea and 11.5 percent reported bathing in pipes, wells, or canals. Open air bathing of street children is in fact a very common sight in all parts of India. These children have to put their naked bodies on display for a very long time before, during and after bathing. As a result, they develop hardly any sense of modesty. They as well as the onlookers have a casual approach to this phenomenon. Street children also lack restroom facilities, demonstrated by the fact that 26.4 percent of the children used the roadside or railway line for their toilet. The children reported asking restaurants or hotels for water (69.1 percent) or using pipes and water taps (15.6 percent).

Most of the street children in India also lack access to medical care, which is especially detrimental during times of illness or injury. The study of street children in Bombay found that 34.9 percent had an injury and 18.9 percent had a fever in the past three months. Only about a third of the children received any help with their illness or injury, though some were able to receive help at a government clinic.

Other studies have found that many illnesses are very prevalent among street children. A study conducted in 2002 on the street children in Kolkata found that six in every 554 street children from ages five to fourteen are HIV positive. In Bangor Basti, 98 percent of children are estimated to have dental caries. Additionally, most street children do not have winter clothing, leaving them more vulnerable to illness during the winter.

== Abuse ==
Street children in India are frequently exposed to abuse and extortion. According to UNICEF, violence against children in India includes neglect, emotional abuse, sexual abuse, and exploitation. The rate of child abuse increased to nearly 8000 in 2007. An Indian government study in 2007 stated that two out of every three children in India were physically abused and that 50% of the nearly 12,000 studied children testified to one or more forms of sexual abuse. This increase is probably due to increased awareness and reporting of abuse. Other studies include that 7,200 children, including infants, are raped every year in India, and the government refuses to comment on these serial child abuses that continue. Many child activists believe that cases go unreported.

Because they have no social status and no adults to protect them, street children identify being physically threatened and intimidated by adults as the one factor that contributes most to the misery of living on the streets. The primary cause for this treatment is the views that the police and general public hold toward them: most scorn them and react to them with hostility.

Abuse by the Indian police is often reported by street children. Many street children have reported that police will beat them in order to coerce them into giving them a "cut" for working in certain areas. Police often arrest street children under the Vagrancy Act, and, having no formal way to appeal their arrest, the children must bribe or work at the police station until their "debt" has been paid. Under a government-sponsored programme called "Operation Beggar", street children in Bombay were rounded up and given into what was essentially indebted servitude.

Many factors contribute to the police abuse of street children, including the police perceptions of the children, widespread corruption, a culture of police violence, the inadequacy and non-implementation of legal safeguards, and the level of impunity that the police enjoy. Though the Juvenile Justice Act, which applies to all the states and Union Territories in India except Jammu and Kashmir, prohibits detaining neglected or delinquent juveniles in police lock-ups or jails, it is rarely enforced.

One study that looked at the abuse of street children in Jaipur City, India in 2009 provided new insight into the abuse that street children in India suffer by studying the types and prevalence of abuse and how these things were related to other factors. The street children in the study reported all five types of abuse: general abuse and neglect, health abuse, verbal abuse, physical abuse, psychological abuse, and sexual abuse. Verbal and psychological abuse were reported the most. Older children and children with higher incomes were abused more than younger children and children with lower incomes, respectively.

== Government involvement ==
Street children in India are "a manifestation of societal malfunctioning and an economic and social order that does not take timely preventative action". Thus, many scholars believe that fixing the problems of street children depends on addressing the causal factors of their situations. Additionally, as these causal factors are addressed, help for the immediate situation of street children must also be given.

India has set in place various forms of public policy concerning street children over the past two decades, but they have largely been ineffective because they are uninformed by sociological, anthropological, and geographical research on street children, meaning they do not always correctly assess and address needs.

Prior to 1997, the "Official Vocabulary" of post-independence India did not contain the term "street child", and street children were only helped because they were grouped with other children that worked on the streets. For instance, the Coordination Committee for Vulnerable Children worked to give identity cards to children working on the streets in order to help protect them from police violence. In the early 1990s, facing pressure from non-governmental organisations (NGOs), the Indian government created the "Scheme for Assistance to Street Children", which launched in February 1993. Though many NGOs had meetings with the government to give feedback about the scheme and suggestions to improve it, none of these recommendations were included in the final draft, making it very difficult for NGOs to participate in it.

Since their entrance into the policy arena and the Scheme was set in place, street children have been included in some other policies and programmes as well. The Indian Council of Child Welfare has included street children in their programmes, and in the 8th Five Year Plan a scheme for children in 6 metropolitan cities was set in place. The Ministry of Labour has also included street children in their livelihood training programmes, though this has been met with minimal success because many street children do not have the education necessary to participate in the programmes.

== Recommendations ==
Scholars and agencies have suggested various strategies to help street children, many of which focus on the use of NGOs. A.B. Bose of UNICEF and Sarah Thomas de Benitez of the Consortium for Street Children suggest that the main responsibility of assistance should be given to NGOs, which should be backed financially by the government. Because NGOs have the ability to be more flexible than the government, they are better able to meet the needs of street children in varied circumstances.

The Human Rights Watch suggests that censuses of street children should be taken in various cities in order to help NGOs have accurate data about the street children population and plan programmes accordingly. The Human Rights Watch also makes various legal suggestions for the protection of street children in their study of police abuse and killings of street children. These suggestions include the amendment of Sections 53 and 54 of the Code of Criminal Procedures to make a medical examination necessary when a street child is detained, ratifying the United Nations 1984 Convention Against Torture and Other Forms of Cruel, Inhuman, or Degrading Treatment or Punishment, and to amend the Juvenile Justice Act in order to create a mechanism for complaints and prosecutions for abuse.

== In popular culture ==
- Mira Nair's Academy Award-nominated film, Salaam Bombay! (1988), film about Mumbai's underbelly, prostitution and street children. It also used street children as actors.
- A 2016 film called, Lion, is based on the life of Saroo Brierley. It shows his experiences as a street child in Kolkata, India.

== See also ==
- Child trafficking in India
- Child labour in India
- Youth in India
- Bachpan Bachao Andolan
- Odisha State Child Protection Society
- Poverty in India
- Street children in the Philippines
- Street children in Bangladesh
