= Homelessness in Germany =

Homelessness in Germany is a significant social issue, estimated to affect around 678,000 people, including about 372,000 people accommodated by public services, e.g., in municipal refugee shelters. As of 2017 there had been a 150% increase in the homeless population within the country since 2014. Around 22,000 of the homeless population are reported to be children.

In addition, the country has yet to publish statistics on homelessness at a Federal Level despite it being an ongoing and widespread matter.

== History ==
=== Prior to WWII ===
In 1933, the Nazi Party passed a Law "against Habitual and Dangerous Criminals", which allowed for the relocation of beggars, homeless, and the unemployed to concentration camps.

=== WWII and its impact ===
In 1942, British bombing raids destroyed a total of 3.6 million homes, with 7.5 million Germans left homeless.

== Current statistics ==
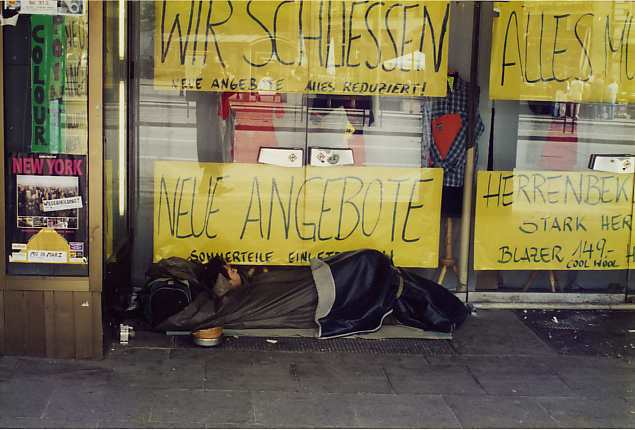
A homeless person sleeping on the street

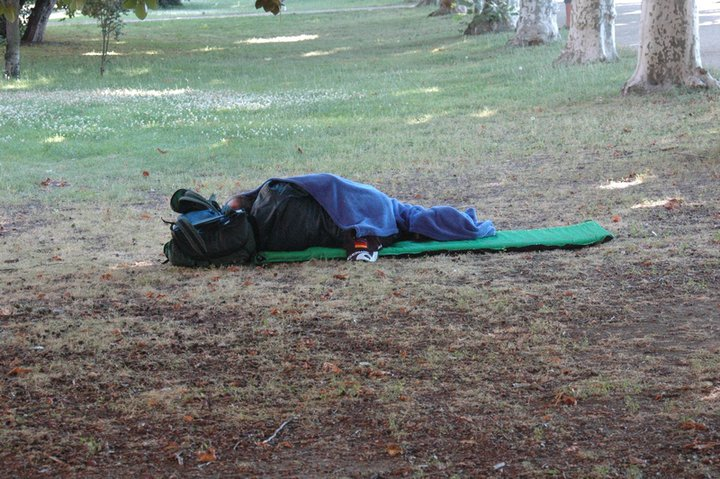
A homeless person in Frankfurt

The homeless levels have risen more than 4% between 2017–2018. In addition, according to BAGW's report, refugees are more likely to be homeless. The number of homeless people with a refugee background increased by 5.9%. A majority of the homeless population is men (three in four). There is a worrying increase in the amount of young homeless in some countries including Germany. According to the German Federal Ministry for Housing, more than half a million people in Germany are homeless as of August 2025.

== Causes ==
The Federal Government acknowledges that homelessness in Germany is caused by multiple factors, "such as financial, domestic, and individual psychosocial reasons" and that it is not merely rooted in the lack of affordable accommodation. According to Global Homelessness Statistics, "Around 50% of poor households spend more than 40% of their disposable income on housing". The Berlin Homeless Shelter Association provides housing to the homeless population in Berlin, Germany.

== Prevention ==
Research has been conducted to investigative proactive ways to prevent homelessness. People being evicted from their homes is one of the most common factors for homelessness. Some instruments used to stop the eviction process, include financial support, legal provision for cases of hardship, and assistance negotiations with landlords. As stated by Dr. Busch-Geertsema, coordinator of the European Observatory on Homelessness, prevention is categorized in several ways: primary prevention (larger risk groups), secondary prevention (those being threatened with eviction), and tertiary prevention (persons who are already homeless).

== See also ==
- List of countries by homeless population
