= Homelessness in the Netherlands =

Homelessness in the Netherlands is a growing social problem in the Netherlands, affecting 30,600 people in 2023. The homeless population has risen between the years of 2009 and 2019.

== Statistics ==
In 2015, 31,000 people did not have a permanent place to stay, 13,000 more than in 2009 (74% increase over 6 years). The increase of non-Western population was larger, about 100%. Especially among young people homelessness is high. Between January 2015 and 2016 homelessness among people aged 18 through 30 increased from 8,000 to 12,400, an increase of 55% in just one year. In 2018, the number of homeless has risen to 39,300.

In international comparison, the proportion of homelessness among legal residents of the Netherlands (0.18%) is equal to homelessness in the United States (0.18%), slightly lower than in France (0.21%), and even lower than in the United Kingdom (0.31%) and Germany (0.35%). Official statistics of homelessness in the Netherlands are collected by Statistics Netherlands and do not include numbers of people who live in the Netherlands who are homeless, but do not have legal immigration status in the country.

== Housing solutions ==
Several organizations in the Netherlands, like the Salvation Army, offer places to stay for a night. Reasons that many homeless people do not want to sleep in shelters, sometimes even when it freezes, include high drunkenness among residents, fighting, screaming, sexual harassment, and stealing of personal properties by residents of shelters.

Homeless people sleep in the streets, alleys, under bridges, in fields, dunes, along highways, in forests or illegally enter buildings. The number of outside dwellers is higher in the summer than in the winter, when additional places are offered in the shelters. It is illegal to sleep without a permit on property that isn't one's own, so homeless people regularly get fined.

== See also ==
- List of countries by homeless population
