= Hus Forbi =

Hus Forbi is a street newspaper in Denmark. Founded in 1996, the newspaper is published monthly with a circulation of about 90,000. It is sold by 2,750 homeless or formerly homeless people on the streets outside supermarkets, train stations and alike. It is sold for 50 kroner and the seller earns 25 kroner. The articles mainly deal with homeless issues and homeless are involved in the editorial work. There is also a Hus Forbi Advent calendar. To avoid fraud, the sellers are certified and have an identification card with their photo, name and number, which has to be visible.

== See also ==
- Homelessness in Denmark
