= Child trafficking in India =

A child disappears every 8 minutes according to the national crime records reviewer. The rate of child trafficking in India is very high. Children tricked into the hands of traffickers or directly kidnapped and sold into slavery. Children are then subjected into commercial sexual exploitation, forced labour and domestic servitude. Even though India has implemented anti trafficking initiatives and legal protections they still struggle to enforce them. They lack intersectionality and don't fully cover the economic and cultural institutions that uphold the pathway for trafficking. Because of the nature of this crime, it is hard to track; due to the poor enforcement of laws, it is difficult to prevent. here are many different causes that lead to child trafficking, with the primary reasons being poverty, weak law enforcement, and a lack of good quality public education. The traffickers that take advantage of children can be from another area in India, or could even know the child personally. Children who return home after being trafficked often face shame in their communities, rather than being welcomed home.

== Causes ==
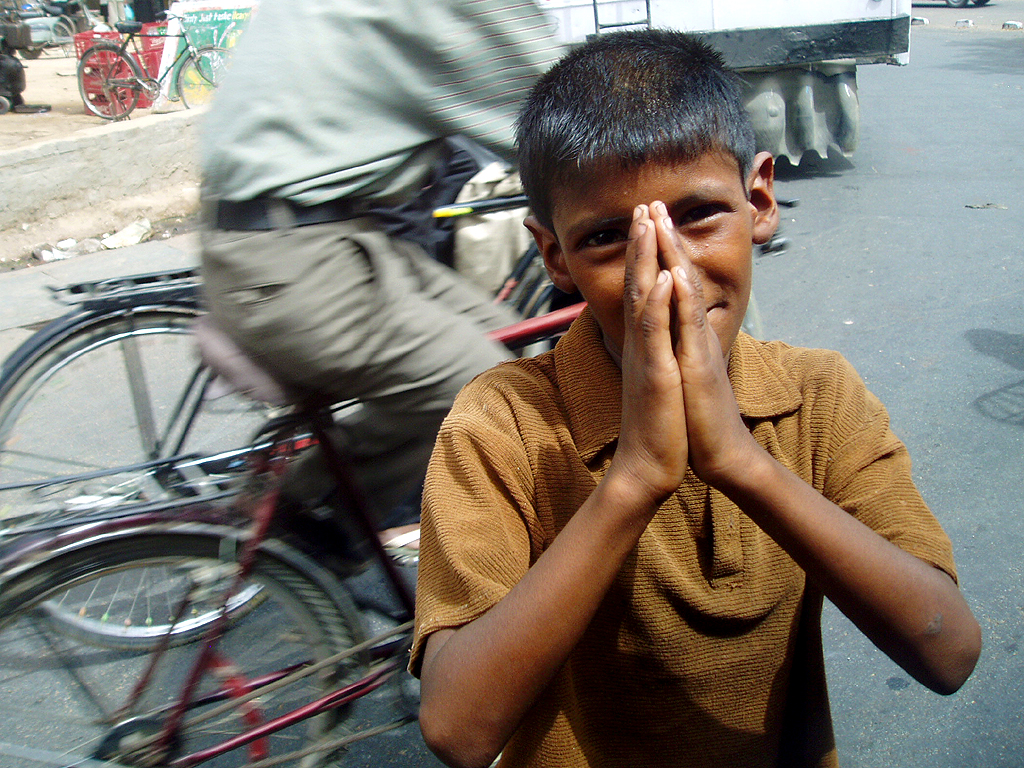
Agra child begs for alms while saluting Namaste.

Child trafficking is directly associated with limited access to education, weakness in child protection systems, gender discrimination and socioeconomic inequalities. Poverty leaves families left without any safe net. They are left desperate trying to find any form of income, this desperation is exploited by traffickers. Limiting access to education leaves kids stationary and easy targets. Instead of being at school they are stuck living in impoverished living conditions. Restricting children's opportunities to odd jobs makes it easier for traffickers to trick them into being taken. Institutional conditions of poverty and the social expectation for children to contribute to the household is what leaves them vulnerable to exploitation.

Another institutional condition of child trafficking are the societal norms that child traffickers prey on. Wisniewski, Kim Olsen highlights how social relations, child labour risks and gender norms are all key components that work together. They found that an increase in women's employment then lowers child labour risks. In areas that have strict seclusion norms, children were at higher risk. Allowing for both parent to provide an income lowers the need for child labour, which then lowers the chances of a child being exposed to exploitative work

The importance of identifying the expectations and beliefs that a society uses to sustain collective practices is crucial. Both normative and empirical expectation surrounding India. However the issue of child trafficking is an intersectional issue. While normative and empirical expectations do play a part, socioeconomic institutions, institutional failure and individual exploitation should also be taken into account. children, especially girls, are left to deal with unequal access to protection as well as gender discrimination

=== Education ===
Education is often a child's only chance at escaping exploitation. When financing education becomes difficult, children often take misleading employment offers in hope of funding their education. Children take these misleading job opportunities if they know that education is no longer an option. Their desperation is preyed on by traffickers, leaving children paid very low or not at all. It can also be linked to feelings of increased vulnerability, low self-esteem, and a lack of knowledge about their rights. The absence of an effective public education system, and a lack of financial security make finding employment in unskilled labour sectors (such as construction and domestic help) much more appealing to children rather than pursuing an education. A lack of good, affordable educational opportunities and financial security can lead to a devaluing of education from the parents' perspectives. This is especially true for girls. When weighing the costs of educating a daughter against other costs to the family, a daughter's education is often foregone. Since the financial benefits of an education are only truly seen in the future, the value of an education in the present is considered to be quite low. This reasoning is supported by the lack of economic opportunities available to underprivileged and marginalized communities in India. The lack of educational opportunities is exploited by traffickers who often sell parents and children alike on the promise of steady, high paying jobs to lure them away from their homes.

=== Additional causes ===
In addition to institutional challenges in India, traditional religious and cultural practices also pose a threat to vulnerable children. In some parts of India, for example, young girls are forced into the system of Devadasi where they're "forced into a lifetime of ritual sex slavery" and given to an elder of the village to be their concubine. Child marriage is also one of the leading causes of child trafficking. A lot of children have also been trafficked due to the demand by tourists. People will travel from countries where there are strict enforcement around child trafficking, as well as it being heavily frowned upon and socially unaccepted, to India to find child prostitutes.

== Forms ==
The different forms of child trafficking include, but are not limited to: involuntary domestic servitude, forced child labor, illegal activities, child soldiers, and children exploited for commercial sex.

=== Involuntary domestic servitude ===
Children are very vulnerable when it comes to domestic servitude. Often children are told that they will be offered excellent wages to work as a domestic helper in middle-class homes, but they usually end up being severely underpaid, abused, and sometimes sexually assaulted. This particular type of trafficking is hard to detect because it takes place inside private homes where there is no public enforcement. Every year hundreds of thousands of girls are trafficked from rural India to work as domestic helpers in the urban areas.

=== Forced child labor ===
Legally, children in India are allowed to do light work, but they are often trafficked for bonded labour and domestic work, and are worked far beyond what is allowed in the country. Children are also forced to work as bonded labourers in brick and stone quarries to pay off family debts owed to moneylenders and employers. They are often forced to work in the use of contraptions that bound them to be unable to escape and then forced to submit to control. Others may be bound by abuse whether physical, emotional, or sexual. Children from India's rural areas migrate or are trafficked for employment in industries, such as spinning mills, cottonseed production, manual work, domestic work in family homes, stone quarrying, brick kilns and tea gardens amongst others, where they are forced to work in hazardous environments for little or no pay. Those forced into labor lose all freedom, being thrown into the workforce, essentially becoming slaves, and losing their childhood.

=== Illegal activities ===
Children, over adults are often chosen to be trafficked for illegal activities such as begging and organ trade, as they are seen as more vulnerable. Not only are these children being forced to beg for money, but a significant number of those on the streets have had limbs forcibly amputated, or even acid poured into their eyes to blind them by gang masters. Those who are injured tend to make more money, which is why they are often abused in this way. Organ trade is also common, when traffickers trick or force children to give up an organ.

UNICEF estimates that more than 300,000 children under 18 are currently being exploited in more than 30 armed conflicts worldwide. While the majority of child soldiers are between the ages of 15 and 18, some are as young as 7 or 8 years of age. A large number of children are abducted to use as soldiers. Others are used to serve as porters, cooks, guards, servants, messengers, or spies. Many of these young soldiers are sexually abused which often ends with unwanted pregnancies and sexually transmitted diseases. Some children have been forced to commit atrocities against their families and communities. Reports indicate that children were coerced by anti government naxalites to join children's units (“Bal Dasta”), where they were trained and used as couriers and informants, to plant improvised explosive devices and in front-line operations against national security forces.

=== Children exploited for commercial sex ===
Children that are exploited for commercial sex are subject to transactions for child pornography and child prostitution and rape. The Commercial Sexual Exploitation (CSE) of women and children generates approximately 400 million US Dollars annually in the city of Mumbai alone. Although it is hard to find accurate numbers for exactly how many children are trafficked, studies and surveys sponsored by the Ministry of Women and Child Development (MWCD) estimates that there are about three million prostitutes in the country, of which an estimated 40 percent are children, as there is a growing demand for very young girls to be inducted into prostitution on account of customer preferences. There are many severe consequences these children face from being sexually exploited.

== Prevalence ==
Child trafficking is an issue that is extremely prevalent in India, and is continuing to grow rapidly. The trafficking of young girls (under the age of 18) has grown 14 times over the last decade and has grown by 65% in the year 2014 according to the National Crime Record Bureau (NCRB). There have been numerous reports about the increase of trafficking taking place across India. According to the US State Department, there are approximately 600,000 to 820,000 people trafficked a year across international borders, and up to 50% of those are children. This is definitely seen as a growing issue in Asia, with the many children that are and continue to be trafficked and exploited for many reasons. In India specifically, it is estimated that there are around 135,000 children trafficked each year.

In 2005, a study was conducted by the National Human Rights Commission of India (NHRC) after they received an alarming number of reports from the press, police, and non-government organisations (NGOs) about the rise of human trafficking within India. They found that India was fast becoming a source, transit point and destination for traffickers of women and children for sexual and non-sexual purposes. This finding has only increased since being recognised in 2005, and is becoming a very large problem. Almost 20,000 children and women were subjected to human trafficking in 2016. This is nearly a 25% rise from 2015. The areas of the greatest concern were poverty stricken areas such as Andhra Pradesh, Bihar, Karnataka, Uttar Pradesh, Maharashtra, Madhya Pradesh, Rajasthan, Orissa and West Bengal. The state within India which has the most child trafficking is Assam, holding 38% of the nation's cases. While the issue of child trafficking is higher in some specific parts of India, it is a widespread problem all over the nation. It is difficult to find exact numbers on the issue of child trafficking due to the fact that it is illegal, so the process is very secretive. From the information that is known, there is a very clear increase, not only over the past decade, but also from year to year. This is extremely concerning and the data seems to point to the assumption that it will continue to rise.

== Figures in India ==
- In 1998, between 5,000 and 7,000 Nepalese girls, some barely 9–10 years old were trafficked into the red light districts in Indian cities. More than 250,000 Nepalese women and girls were already in Indian brothels at the time.
- According to UNICEF, 12.6 million children are engaged in hazardous occupations.
- In 2009, it was estimated that 1.2 million children were trafficked worldwide for sexual exploitation, including for prostitution or the production of sexually abusive images.
- Only 10% of human trafficking in India is international, while 90% is interstate.
- According to a report by the National Human Rights Commission of India, 40,000 children are abducted each year, leaving 11,000 untraced.
- NGO's estimate that between 12,000 and 50,000 women and children are trafficked into the country annually from neighbouring nations as a part of the sex trade.
- There are an estimated 300,000 child beggars in India.
- Every year, 44,000 children fall into the clutches of gangs.
- In 2015, only 4,203 human trafficking cases were investigated in India.
- In 2014, 76% of all people trafficked in India were women and girls.
- Children make up roughly 40% of prostitutes.
- It is estimated that over 2 million women and children are trafficked for sex into the red-light districts in India.
- The Indian Government estimates that girls make up the majority of children in sex trafficking.
- According to the CBI (Central Bureau of Investigation) reports from 2009, there are an estimated 1.2 million children involved in prostitution in India.

== Actions against trafficking ==
Action against child trafficking in India is being taken at many levels. The central government's response can be seen at a policy level in terms of the schemes they provide, and at a legal level in the form of acts and amendments they pass. State governments have also been noted to take action to address child trafficking by making an effort to implement schemes and laws at the state-level. Any gaps in the implementation of schemes and laws are largely filled in by non-governmental organizations that work to address different aspects of this issue.

=== Indian government's response ===
India is viewed as a hub for human trafficking, however the issue is of low priority for Indian Government. The Immoral Traffic Prevention Act was first amended in 1956. The act was created to prevent trafficking and sexual exploitation of women and children but the Act does not provide a clear definition of "'trafficking'". In 2003, India enforced the United Nations Convention against Transnational Organised Crime, which includes three protocols, specifically the Protocol to Prevent, Suppress, and Punish Trafficking in Persons, especially Women and Children. The protocol "provides an agreed upon definition of trafficking in persons. It aims at comprehensively addressing trafficking in persons through the so-called three P's - Prosecution of perpetrators, Protection of victims and Prevention of trafficking." The protocol defines trafficking as "the recruitment, transportation, transfer, harbouring or receipt of persons, by means of the threat or use of force or other forms of coercion, of abduction, of fraud, of deception, of the abuse of power or of position of vulnerability or of the giving or receiving of payments or benefits to achieve the consent of a person having control over another person, for the purpose of exploitation. Exploitation shall include, at a minimum, the exploitation of the prostitution of others or other forms of sexual exploitation, forced labour or service, slavery or practice similar to slavery, servitude or the removal of organ."

=== Anti Child Trafficking Unit ===
In India- Tamil Nadu is the only State constituted Anti- Child Trafficking Unit, which is an outcome Habeas corpus petition (HCP 881/2016) filed by Advocate Natarajan V, the Landmark Judgement has been Passed by Justice Nagamuthu and Justice Bharathidhasan of Madras High Court. This is one of the important milestone in preventing Child Trafficking in Tamilnadu. More than 30,000 children have been rescued by this special unit ACTU.

On the international stage, intergovernmental organisations, like the United Nations, have been introducing measures to address child trafficking since the early 1900s with varying degrees of success. Some of their more notable measures include the passage of the Universal Declaration of Human Rights in 1948 by the United Nations, and the adoption of the UN Protocol to Prevent, Suppress and Punish Trafficking in Persons, Especially Women and Children in 2000.

On a national level, Article 23 of the Constitution of India explicitly bans human trafficking. The Government of India has also passed other acts and amended the Indian Penal Code (IPC) to address the challenge of child trafficking. The Immoral Traffic (Prevention) Act, 1986 (ITPA) is an amended version of The Suppression of Immoral Traffic in Women and Girls Act, 1956 (SITA). SITA made human trafficking for prostitution illegal and outlined legal action against people involved in human trafficking in any capacity. ITPA made laws friendlier towards the victim. ITPA also created a system to rehabilitate victims of trafficking and prevent them from bring trafficked again. In 2013, the IPC was amended to create new provisions to address human trafficking in India that are more in line with the UN Protocol to Prevent, Suppress and Punish Trafficking in Persons, especially Women and Children.

== Critical reframing ==
The way in which the current legal system operates to address child trafficking in India can be considered to be coming into direct conflict with the trend of independent child migration that is seen across the country. Scholars raise the argument that at times child welfare laws and anti child trafficking laws can put independent child migrants at risk. The current laws make it difficult for children seeking employment in their hometowns, because there are limited opportunities. Children between the ages of 14 and 18 are also not allowed to work in a number of industries that are considered hazardous. Children above the age of 14 are not required by law to remain in school adding to this underage labour force. Such a situation often pushes children to seek employment in informal sectors, such as the service and handicraft industries, which more often than not also require them to migrate to urban centres. Children migrating with non-family adults for work often get mistaken for victims of child trafficking, since the current laws do not account for the possibility of independent child migrants. These children are usually forced to remain in shelters or are returned to their homes. The adults involved are accused of being traffickers and face legal action. Scholars argue that this limitation in the legal system may put independent child migrants at risk who are forced to depend on trafficking agents for passage to cities or are forced to make the dangerous journey on their own as a result. Although there are no clear responses to this challenge yet, scholars have proposed certain possible solutions such as changing the education system to include skills training, creating employment opportunities for rural populations, and better training for law enforcement officials working to address child trafficking.

== See also ==
- Child labour in India
- Human trafficking in India
- Human trafficking in Nepal
- International child abduction
- Odisha State Child Protection Society
- Street children in India
