= Homelessness in Switzerland =

Homelessness in Switzerland is a recognized social issue, although reliable national estimates only began to emerge in the 2020s. Homelessness is less visible than in some other major Western countries, yet remains a persistent concern. In Geneva, most homeless individuals are Swiss or French nationals, with smaller numbers from other backgrounds.

Research has highlighted links between homelessness and mental health. One Swiss study found that 1.6 percent of all psychiatric inpatients were homeless. The study reported that social factors and psychopathology are independently contributing to the risk of homelessness. In response to growing need, community organizations such as the Suneboge center in Zurich provide food and essential services to those affected.

== History ==
In 2014, The Guardian reported that Geneva authorities were using Cold War-era fallout shelters to provide temporary accommodation for homeless individuals during the winter months. Originally built to protect civilians in the event of nuclear war, these underground shelters were later adapted to provide around 200 beds per night during the winter months. Guests were permitted to stay for up to 30 days, and the facilities served over 1,500 people from 65 nationalities in one season. The article described the shelters as “nothing short of a lifesaver for many.”

In 2024, Swissinfo reported that emergency shelters in cities such as Bern, Zurich, Basel, and Geneva were operating at or near capacity. A 2022 study by the University of Applied Sciences and Arts Northwestern Switzerland estimated around 2,200 homeless people nationwide. Job loss, illness, and the effects of the COVID-19 pandemic are among the reasons people become homeless. Some have difficulty getting support, especially people without legal residence status and those who have mental health or addiction problems. In 2020, Basel began a pilot "Housing First" programme, providing housing without preconditions.
