= Homelessness in Greece =

Austerity measures and the ongoing fiscal crisis have significantly spurred the rise in homelessness in Greece in the 21st century. Instances of homelessness have been dominantly concentrated in the city of Athens. Homelessness remains a relatively under-examined area of social policy in Greece, with the first organised counting for homeless people taking place in May 2018. Governments and non-profit organisations alike have made efforts to counter this phenomenon.

== Definition ==
A definition of homelessness was written into Greece's national legislation in 2012. Article 29 of Law 4052 includes two defining provisions. Firstly, the homeless are "all persons legally residing in the country, that have no access, or have unsafe access to sufficient privately owned, rented or bestowed housing that meets the required specification and has basic water services and electricity." Secondly, the term homeless includes those who live in temporary institutions, hostels, on the street, or "other inappropriate accommodation".

== Historical background and causes ==
=== Neoliberalism ===
Favouritism of the free market became more prevalent in Southern Europe in the late 1980s as well as 1990s, manifesting as cuts to social welfare and deregulation of urban development. Prior to this, government already encouraged small-scale property ownership as a free market good. Constructing without a building permit became commonplace and vulnerable groups relied on charities or religious bodies for support. Housing protection became identified as a constitutional right in the 1980s, but no relevant policy developments were made. Family provision in Greece plays a large role in the welfare model in place of the government, as views regarding the sanctity of marriage and solidarity between generations are more pronounced in Greece than other nations. These values encouraged families to shelter members, especially female members, from facing homelessness whilst those without kin networks were further entrenched. Liberalization of the labour market and services market liberalization were among instruments enacted in response to competitiveness in 2010. More recently, the increase in Airbnb rentals in urban centres and tourist areas has increased average rent prices, making it more difficult for locals to find adequate accommodation arrangements.

=== Fiscal crisis ===
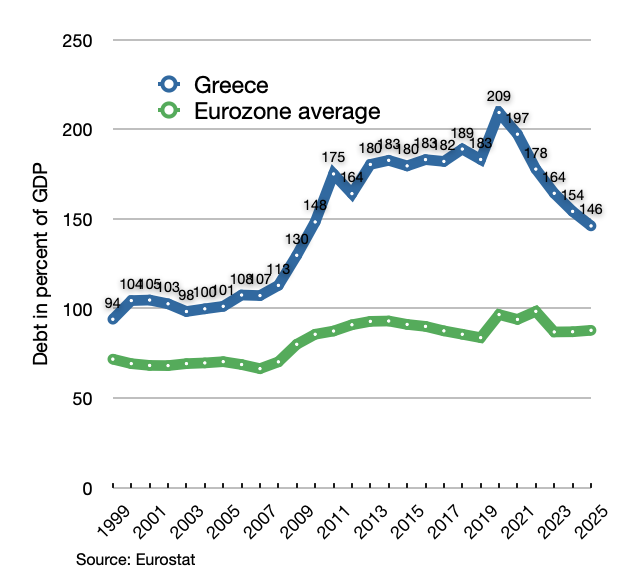
Greece government-debt compared with EU average, 1999-2019

Low exports and prevalent corruption led to a weak economy after the 2004 Olympics. The subsequent public deficit was counteracted by borrowing, but the 2008 financial crisis made markets more fragile and Greece was forced to further borrow from global markets with higher interest rates. The Greek debt in relation to GDP reached 109.4% in 2008 and government revenue stagnated during 2001-2007. The new government in 2009 presented the true size of the budget deficit which was 15.2% of GDP. Markets lost confidence in the national economy. Facing bankruptcy in 2010, Greece signed three Memorandums otherwise known as bailout agreements in a failed effort to stabilise the economy. Greece received economic aid from three international creditors – the European Union, the European Central Bank, and the International Monetary Fund in 2010, 2012, and 2015 respectively. The conditions of structural reform and austerity measures meant that income, pensions, unemployment, savings, and other economic factors were all impacted. The government increased taxes such as VAT and reduce public costs. Expenditure on the National Health System and reductions in pensions and welfare benefits also took place, eroding the level of disposable income for many Greeks. Unemployment rose to 27.5% in December 2013, with the total number of unemployed reaching 1,363,137. 24% of households were unable to repay mortgage instalments or rent. Significant tax indebtedness of private households prompted the seizure of bank accounts, and eventually foreclosures of housing. As a result, the homeless population has gone from 11,000 people in 2009 to 40,000 people in 2016.

== Categories ==
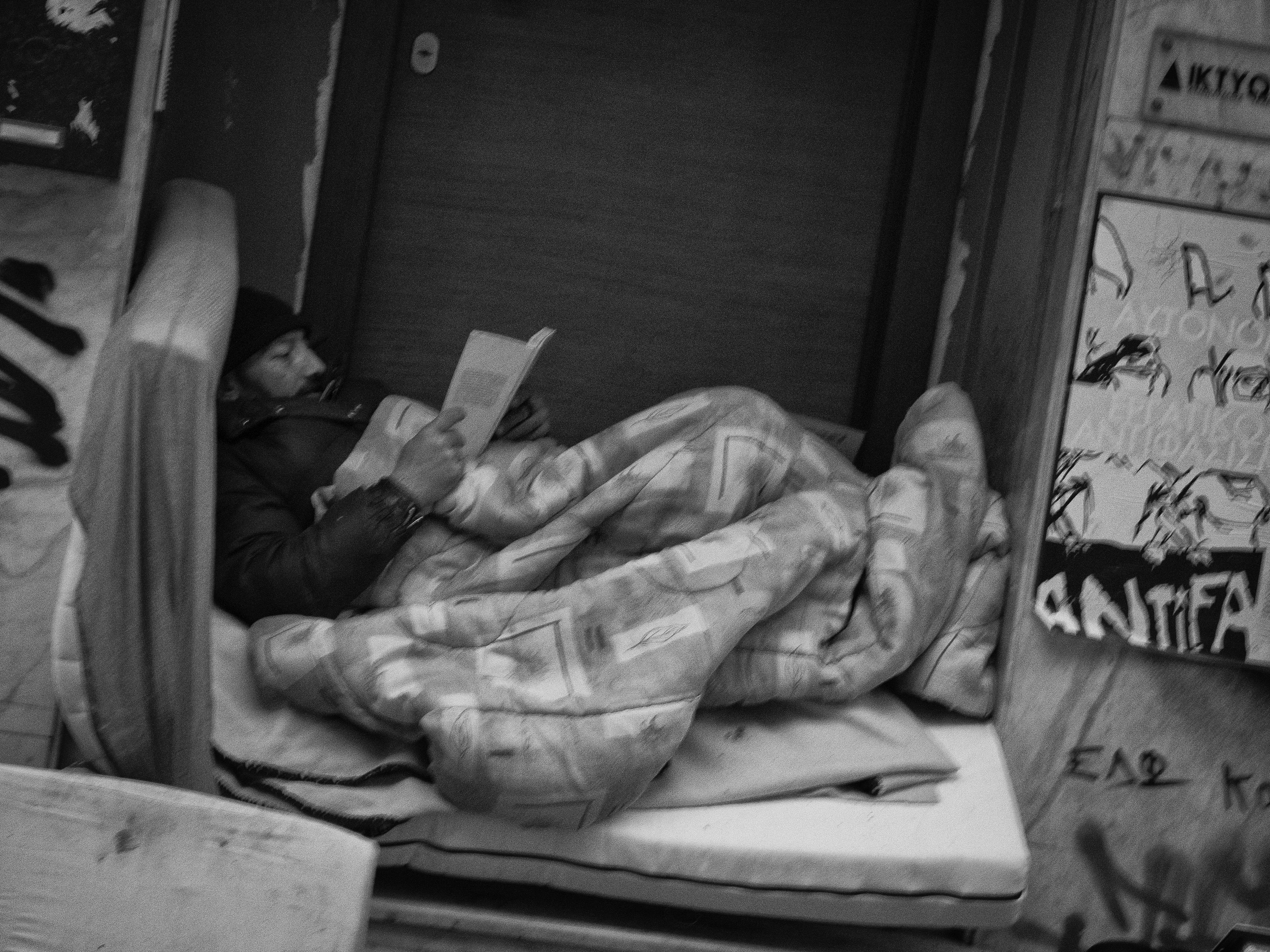
Homeless person in Athens

The non-profit organisation Klimaka introduced the term "neo-homelessness" as a descriptor of the diverse population of people rendered homeless by the fiscal crisis in Greece. It identified three main categories which homeless Greek people can be separated into.

=== Combination of factors ===
Homeless people who have experienced unemployment and low income, a lack of supportive networks, and mental health issues (often coupled with gambling, drug, or alcohol abuse) are placed in this category. They are often homeless for long periods of time and experiencing mental health disorders. As of 2018, unaccompanied minors have 1,191 placed available in shelters and apartments in Greece, with 2,485 on the waiting list. The number of people staying in apartments without heating or electricity or experiencing eviction has increased as well. The National Company of Electricity released a statement in 2016 estimating that 350,000 clients had debts valued at a total of approximately 1 billion euros.

=== The "new homeless" ===
20% of the "new homeless" have higher education qualifications. Many were formerly employed in the technical, construction, or tourism industries and were accustomed to adequate living standards. They usually do not have severe psychological disorders or involvement in delinquency and have a more potential for social reintegration than the “traditional” homeless.

=== Immigrants, asylum seekers, and refugees ===
Immigrants and refugees transitioning into permanent residency often face overcrowding and inadequate housing conditions. Almost 95% of discharged migrants from the Young Offenders Prison has no housing solution. Refugees crossing the Greek-Macedonian borders after the 2016 EU-Turkey deal were displaced and sought accommodation in camps, athletic fields, airports, and ports. In September 2018, 32,189 migrants or people seeking international protection in Greece resided in 34 open reception facilities and identification centres all over Greece. Of this number, approximately 18,000 Turks were restricted from further entering on the Aegean islands which had the ability to accommodate in camps and detention facilities. Racist Violence Recording Network recorded an increase in violent assaults against migrants and refugees, attributing some to housing issues

=== Street children ===
Greece's street child activity is heavily connected with human trafficking. In 2003, street children located in state-run facilities had disappeared. The disappearance is suspected to be linked to human trafficking. The numbers have decreased in recent years, and Greece has taken "legislative action to criminalize human trafficking and related crimes", though Amnesty International reports that the problem still exists, and there is a failure of government protection and justice of trafficked children.

Begging and other street activities have been outlawed in Greece since 2003, but the recent unemployment hike has increased levels of these actions.

There are few programs for displaced children in Greece, which created a street child problem in the early 2000s. Giving foster parents to special needs children is not something the Greek government has done, leading to higher numbers of physically or mentally disabled street children. There are also deterrents for working and poor parents in Greece making them more willing to force their children to the streets. For example, orphans are given financial benefits, but if they live in state-run facilities they cannot receive these benefits. For working parents to get government subsidies, they often have to have more than one child.

== Effects ==
=== Psychological ===
Higher rates of mental health disorders have been recorded in the homeless Greek population compared to the non-homeless one. Those who are unemployed in Greece are twice as likely to experience mental health problems than those who are employed. Academics conducted Mini International Neuropsychiatric Interviews on 254 homeless people in Athens in 2013, and found that 16.1% of participants had mood disorders, 11.8% had anxiety disorders, and 13.0% had psychotic disorders. Females experienced higher rates of these disorders. These disorders sometimes intersected with substance abuse, with 5.5% citing alcohol dependence (all of them male) and 6.3% citing drug abuse. Being older and living on the streets for more months increased the likelihood of developing psychiatric disorders. Greek people facing homelessness also tend to underutilize mental health services and usually do not contact psychiatric services.

=== Demographic ===
The threat of homelessness has, in part, caused demographic shifts by contributing to poor economic conditions. A worsening birth rate of 3.9% due to high costs has been noted. The phenomenon of brain drain has also been intensified, with 350,000 to 427,000 Greeks emigrating for employment opportunities. Symeon Mavridis refers to a “lost generation” of citizens born in the 1980s and 1990s which has affected productivity and the social insurance system.

=== Living conditions ===
One in ten homeless Greek people have sought refuge in a car, whilst one in seven have visited the hospital at least once to stay overnight. For 52.4%, access to food is not a daily problem and 47.1% find that clothing is not an issue. It was found that 41% indicate that finding a place to wash or bathe is a problem. About half of homeless Greeks live with between zero and 20 euros per month. During the transpiration of the economic crisis, an increase in calls relating to domestic violence and welfare issues as well as unexpected crises were made to the National Centre for Social Solidarity. Nearly half a million Greeks frequently visit soup kitchens organized by the Church of Greece.

=== Informal housing ===
Demand for unaffordable urban space has led to informal construction and unplanned residential development in areas traditionally intended for agricultural and forest land use. Homelessness and the inability to pay for formal dwellings in major cities such as Athens has contributed to this urban sprawling process which incurs threats to biodiversity, desertification, and local water contamination. As of 2009, around 3,000 new unlicensed buildings were being legalised and integrated into the urban system per year.

== Efforts to assist homeless people ==
=== Government ===
Some regulatory practices have been implemented to assist the homeless, with others still underway. Strong American influences on policy have resulted in two main approaches, the “staircase of transition” and “Housing First”. The former operates under the assumption that providing improving levels of temporary housing will lead to permanent housing, whilst the latter assumes that other social services can be leveraged to empower the person to achieve security. The Housing and Reintegration Program was created in the pressurised fiscal environment in 2013, with €9.25 million allocated to local municipalities, NGOs, regional authorities, and church foundations. Since then, a National Strategy for Homelessness was established in 2018 with the aims of recording annual reduction targets, updating relevant legislation, and creating a separate sub-mechanism for stakeholder collaboration.

Most homeless people are unable to receive unemployment benefits due to inability to comply with bureaucratic processes. These include providing a document or certificate from the Tax Office, public utility bills, landline telephone bills, or copies of an official tenancy agreement. Some practices associated with homelessness have been criminalized, most notably the banning of begging under Penal Code article 407.

=== Local government ===
At a local level, authorities have started to become operational centres for a variety of social services including public space regulation, recognition of beneficiaries for housing assistance, and support for financially vulnerable people. Municipalities have cooperated with non-profit organisations to create ‘Day Centres’ and ‘Night Shelters’, as well as integrate homeless services into their plans. These are continuing under the recognition of homelessness as a social issue with a need to be addressed within axe 9 of Structural Funds 2014-2020. Other practices that municipalities provide include issuing health cards for those who are uninsured, granting allowances, and investigating the living conditions of children with juvenile court orders.

=== Non-profit organizations ===
Several non-profit organisations provide services for the homeless population. The charity Emfasis facilitates around 110 volunteers in Athens who give advice on welfare access and distribute food, blankets, books, and other essential goods. Another NGO called Praksis runs a day centre which allows people to wash their clothes, take a shower, and sleep in a bed. Shedia Magazine aims to provide an alternative to begging for more than 140 people by funnelling half of its proceeds to homeless vendors. There are four shelters in Athens for single refugee women with children run by The National Centre for Social Solidarity in addition to the 19 shelters run by the General Secretariat for Gender Equality.
