= Homelessness in Algeria =

Homelessness in Algeria is a significant social issue affecting a large number people in the country. Homelessness is caused by natural disasters, lack of adequate housing and domestic issues.

Housing is a significant issue in Algeria, in the 2000s, the country had a deficit of some 125,000 units.

Researchers found that some 250,000 Algerians became homeless as a result of the 2003 Boumerdès earthquake.

Changes in family law in Algeria has led to an increase in women and children becoming homeless. According to some researchers, thousands of mothers live on streets with their children, some hire themselves as domestic servants at very cheap rates. The streets and slums of Algeria's cities are the homes of many divorced women. Homeless women are sometimes able to secure refuge in hostels run by the organisation SOS Women in Distress. However, reportedly the organisation is unable to cope with the number of requests it receives due to a lack of funding.
