= Homelessness in China =

In 2011, the Chinese Ministry of Civil Affairs reported that homeless adults were assisted around 2.41 million times, and homeless children were assisted around 179,000 times. In 2024, the ministry reported that there were 1,559 relief management agencies, 78,000 beds, and that homeless people were assisted 671,000 times.

== Causes ==
China maintains a system of housing registration called Hukou, which is the basis for welfare assistance and access to other social benefits. Historically, people with rural Hukou registration have had restricted access to welfare and social services if they live in an urban area. Thus, migrant workers often find themselves in precarious housing arrangements or become homeless. The National Bureau of Statistics of China reported in 2026 that 479.85 million people live in places other than where they are registered.

In 2017, the Beijing municipal government responded to a deadly fire in a crowded building by cracking down on dense illegal shared accommodations and evicting the residents, leaving many migrant laborers homeless. This came in the context of larger attempts by the government in Beijing to limit the population increase, often at the expense of migrant laborers.

In 2024, the State Council issued a five-year action plan directing local governments to "promote eligible rural migrants to enjoy the same rights as local hukou holders in social insurance, housing security, and compulsory education for children accompanying them; and gradually enable unregistered permanent residents to enjoy equalized basic urban public services." As of 2025, restrictions based on housing registration in cities with populations under 3 million have "largely been lifted".

Several natural disasters have led to homelessness in China. The 2000 Yunnan earthquake left 92,479 homeless and destroyed over 41,000 homes.

Homelessness among people with mental health problems is 'much less common' in China than in high-income countries, due to stronger family ties, but is increasing due to migration within families and as a result of the one-child policy. A study in Xiangtan found at least 2439 schizophrenic people that have been homeless on a total population of 2.8 million. It was found that "homelessness was more common in individuals from rural communities (where social support services are limited), among those who wander away from their communities (i.e., those not from Xiangtan municipality), and among those with limited education (who are less able to mobilize social supports). Homelessness was also associated with greater age; [the cause] may be that older patients have ‘burned their bridges’ with relatives and, thus, end up on the streets."

During the Cultural Revolution a large part of child welfare homes were closed down, leaving their inhabitants homeless. By the late 1990s, many new homes were set up to accommodate abandoned children. In 1999, the Ministry of Civil Affairs estimated the number of abandoned children in welfare homes to be 66,000.

== Efforts to assist the homeless ==
The Ministry of Civil Affairs records and publishes data regarding relief efforts.

From 2017 to 2019, the government of Guangdong Province assisted 5,388 homeless people in reuniting with relatives elsewhere in China. The Guangdong government assisted more than 150,000 people over a three-year period.

In 2020, in the wake of the COVID-19 pandemic, the Chinese Ministry of Civil Affairs announced several actions of the Central Committee in response to homelessness, including increasing support services and reuniting homeless people with their families. In Wuhan, the situation for homeless people was particularly bad, as the lockdown made it impossible for homeless migrants to return to other parts of the country. The Wuhan Civil Affairs Bureau set up 69 shelters in the city to house 4,843 people.
