= Homelessness and aging =

Overview article

Homelessness and aging is a largely neglected topic in the literature. There is a widespread assumption that aged homeless people are rare, but this is not true. Japan, Australia and the United Kingdom show increases in their populations of aging homelessness. Increased Elderly adults who straddle the poverty line are at greater risk of falling into pathways of homelessness. When a homeless person enters their later years, or becomes homeless for the first time in older age, health issues can become difficult to address and compound as age progresses.

== Research ==
Research in the older homeless population varies in age classification. The experiences that accompany homelessness, especially in the older population, require a lower age cut off point than is typically used for the older housed population. A specific age for which is considered elderly homeless varies in research, however, there is a general consensus that those older homeless that are between the ages of 50 and 65 years are at greater risks. Those between the ages of 50 and 65 are at greater risks because they fall between viable working age and governmental safety nets. This age group typically experiences poor physical health, poor nutrition and severe living conditions that put them in a greater risk category than those who are younger than 50 and older than 65 years of age. Studies consider this age group of the elderly homeless too old to benefit from employment services and too young for social safety net benefits.

A University of California study has followed 350 participants in Oakland since 2013. Their conclusions were that the majority had worked in low-paid low-skill occupations. 80% were African American. They were at greater risk of homelessness because they spent over 50% of their income on rent. Most were sicker to begin with and therefore spent more on medication. Once homeless, they died at a rate four to five times what would be expected in the general population, from the same causes as do other people – heart disease and cancer – but they do so 20 to 30 years earlier.

A 2013 report commissioned by the Australian Government found that while general homelessness had increased by 3% since 2011, for those over 55 it had increased by 14%, despite Australia having a comprehensive social safety net. The main reasons were Financial difficulties (22%) Domestic and family violence (15%) Housing crisis (14%).

The differences between the housed and homeless living conditions are significant to life expectancy of the older population. Under the conditions of homelessness, it is typical for those 50 and older to resemble similar health conditions to those of a 70 year old housed person. Homelessness has been found to be a factor in dramatically shortening a person's life expectancy. Premature death is most often the result of the combination of acute and chronic medical conditions aggravated by situations of homelessness.

The health of the elderly homeless population is often neglected until the severity of an illness requires emergency room treatment. Economic factors create pathways to homelessness for an increasing population of elderly. The elderly homeless face difficulties that compound with age such as lack of a permanent place to receive health care services, medicine, and medical equipment

Health factors

Older adults who are faced with living on the streets are more at risk for developing chronic and debilitating diseases such as diabetes, heart and related respiratory diseases, and others as a result of premature aging. The effects of premature aging can cause older adults who are homeless to have developed earlier illness in their life than they previously would. Often these individuals are saddled with limited or no access to proper healthcare and are faced with a cycle of living on the streets, being institutionalized or even jailed. As a result of the fluctuating economy, many older adults are finding themselves at risk of homelessness. A group that was once able to live off of savings, retirements, or pensions are finding it increasingly harder to do so. Individuals aged 50–64 have little to no savings and as a result of the Great Recession of 2008 many saw a loss in the value of their property.

Risk factors

Those who are most at risk for homelessness are those who are currently or have lived in poverty in the past. The reasons for homelessness can be characterized into three groups: those who lack stable, social relationships and are "predisposed to personal vulnerabilities", those who lack access to affordable housing, and those who can not afford or receive proper healthcare. Those who do not have strong familial relationships with kids or other family members and do not have strong friend relationships are more at risk of becoming homelessness than those that do.

Resources in the community

To assist with the growing homeless elderly population in the United States there has been several programs initiated. The U.S. Department of Housing and Urban Development (HUD) in 2008 began to provide permanent housing for those who were living on the street and showed proof of disability (mental, physical) and an inability to find affordable housing. Many local and national organizations such as the Hearth Outreach Program (located in Boston), the National Coalition for homelessness, the National Alliance to End Homelessness, Justice in Aging and others, seek ways to raise money and improve the lives of the elderly living in homelessness.
