= Berlin Homeless Shelter Association =

German charity

The Berlin Homeless Shelter Association (or Berliner Asyl-Verein für Obdachlose) was a charity for the homeless based in Berlin, Germany, from 1868 to 1931.

== Background ==
The enormous growth of Berlin as an industrial city and metropolis within the newly formed German Empire led to a wave of immigrants which even the most speculative building programmes could not accommodate. In 1871 alone, more than 130,000 people moved to Berlin. They slept on the streets, in attics, the cattle sheds of the central slaughterhouse, the cheapest boarding houses and shacks. Alcoholism, thievery and prostitution were often their fate. Epidemics ran rife. In winter, tens of thousands more streamed into Berlin after the countryside harvest came to an end. Young girls arriving at the station in the hope of obtaining work as domestic servants were often lured away and forced into prostitution.

== Beginnings ==
The Berlin Homeless Shelter Association was founded in 1868 in Berlin by members of the Friedrichs-Werdeschen-Bezirksverein. The awareness that an individual is not necessarily responsible for his or her homeless condition and that police custody is also not a useful way to deal with the problem led to the founding of the homeless association by engaged and motivated Berlin citizens. Led by banker, Gustav Thölde, its members included industrialist August Borsig, head of the city council Friedrich Kochhann, chaplain Friedrich Gustav Lisco, physician Rudolf Virchow, factory owner, and socialist Paul Singer, and Chief of Police Lothar von Wurmb, amongst others. Thölde remained the association's chairman until his death in 1910.

The association, virtually a 'Who's who' of the Berlin bourgeoisie, was notable for its large number of high-ranking members of Berlin society. Its articles included the daily presence of the members in the association's work. How far those mentioned kept to this requirement is unclear although this example is a characteristic feature of the bourgeoisie of that time. That the association was rooted in the more affluent levels of society meant that the association could exist functionally and financially for a comparatively long time. At the end of the century, it had 4–5,000 members and was financed from donations, legacies, foundations and bequests, as well as charity benefits which raised considerable sums of money for the association. However, many less affluent citizens and social democratic workers counted among its members.

The association was supported above all by liberal Berlin Jews. When a call for donations was made in the Vossischen Zeitung in 1893, many anti-semitic postcards were received in response: "I do not donate to the Berliner Asyl-Verein für Obdachlose because of its exclusively Jewish supporters."

== First shelters ==
The priority was the construction of a women's shelter. On 7 December 1868, the association had already signed a rental contract for a former artillery workshop on the corner of Dorotheenstaße and Wilhelmstraße. A call for donations went out to the Berlin population on 12 December. People were urged to join the association or support it with contributions. At this point, there was accommodation for 60 people who could sleep on metal beds with sprung mattresses in contrast to the unhygienic wooden beds of other establishments. A men's shelter administered by Paul Singer followed in 1873, in Büschungstraße 4 in former Königstadt, near the women's prison. Today a memorial plaque can be found there. In 1876, the association registered 105,000 stays and by the end of 1892, around 2.5 million.

== The Wiesenburg ==
In 1896, a new building in Wiesenstraße in Gesundbrunnen between the Panke canal and the Berlin Ringbahn (circle line) was ready to accommodate 700 men in the 12,000 m^{2} complex. A large donation from Dr Moritz Gerson, amongst others, funded the construction; 400 workers completed the shelter in one year. The site had been carefully chosen: previous experiences with the neighbours of the Friedrichshain house, who felt harassed by the sight of miserable people and claimed that their children were endangered by the homeless, led the association to look for a site as shielded from the neighbourhood as possible. The shelter had a 50 m 'private street', to clear 700 men from the Wiesenstraße as quickly as possible, a small, attractive garden lay at the front, the circle line protected it to the north and the Panke canal to the west.

The shelter, called Die Wiesenburg in popular parlance, was designed by the architects, Georg Toebelmann Georg Toebelmann and Otto Schnock Otto Schnock. The house, still standing and in use today, provided conference rooms for the association and living accommodation for the shelter's employees. Paul Singer was the shelter's administrator, Georg Toebelmann and Rudolf Virchow took charge of hygiene. The shelter was fitted out to the most advanced standards of the day, produced its own electricity, had its own water supply, central heating and air conditioning. It provided dormitories and dining hall, showers and baths with warm water, a library and the possibility to have one's clothes disinfected and washed. Almost every room had electric lighting and running water, and the terrazzo floor was easy to clean.

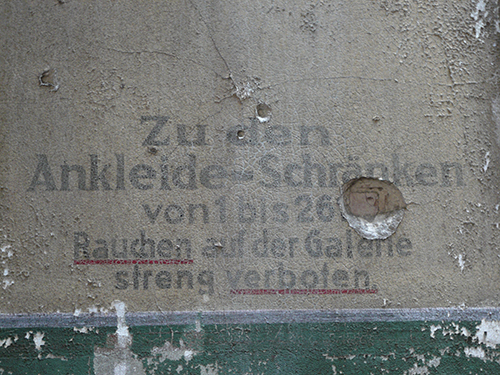
Clothes lockers sign. Smoking STRICTLY forbidden.

Compared to other shelters run by the church or the government, the homeless here were not forced to work nor required to attend religious services. They could remain anonymous. The police were not allowed to enter the premises. Until 1914, overnight guests were provided with soup and bread in the evenings and coffee and a bread roll in the mornings. This humane treatment of the homeless stood in stark contrast to, e.g., 'Die Palme' Die Palme, a government-run shelter in Fröbelstraße, Prenzlauerberg, where homeless persons attempting to stay longer than five nights were sent to a workhouse in Rummelsberg to build irrigation fields outside the city. Or the 'Arbeiterkolonie' in Reinickendorferstraße, Wedding, run on lines dictated by Pastor von Bodelschwingh, who insisted on religious services and required the men to chop wood or break stones for their overnight stay.

In 1906, the shelter was extended to provide 882 places for men and 400 for women. The whole shelter was used not only by the homeless but also migrant workers, seasonal harvest workers and domestic workers. At this time, the shelter was providing far more than 300,000 overnight stays per year. At the beginning of the 1st World War, a firm producing canned goods for the army moved into the women's shelter. By its end, the donation-dependent association was in financial difficulties, and its activities came to a halt for the time being. After the war, the men's shelter was used by commercial firms and some rooms were used as accommodation for Jewish immigrants from the East. In 1924, the SUM-Vergaser-Gesellschaft produced carburettors for motorbikes and aeroplanes on the site (later Berliner Vergaser Fabrik (Berlin Vergaser Fabrik), eventually taking over the whole of the women's shelter. The association was able to reorganise itself in 1926, and the men's shelter reopened, but only with financial help from the state, who insisted on applying the rules of state-run shelters, thus ending the anonymity of its visitors and the independence of the association. State funding ceased in 1931 due to the world financial crisis and the shelter closed forever.

In 1933, the 'National Socialist People's Welfare' (NSV) requisitioned the association's assets. Further industrial tenants moved in, among them a dye firm who produced the party flags for the 1936 Olympic Games (the concrete dyeing vats still stand in the ruin of the former bath and shower room). With the Third Reich's armament policy, SUM became a much larger firm and moved to bigger premises in Michaelkirchstraße, Kreuzberg, where forced labour was used to build weapons.

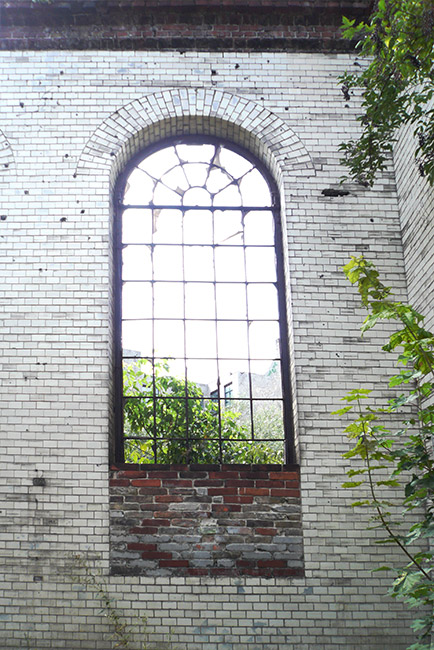
Bullet holes from the end of WWII still dot the walls.

In the early 1940s, a tinned goods firm and the foundry company, Pemietsreider, who made weapons for the German war effort, moved in. Pemetsrieder (previously located in Moabit) was based in the Wiesenburg until 1980. In 1944/45, large parts of the men's dormitories and the washrooms were destroyed by Allied bombing. The administration house and parts of the women's shelter escaped undamaged. Traces of the conflict are still visible; bullet and grenade splinter holes from the last days of the war dot the walls. The building lay on the last main battle line of the surrounded Third Reich capital: the circle line along its northern perimeter, defended by broken-down soldiers from the front, the home guard, policemen and Hitler Youth.

In the 1950s, various small companies moved in and bombed-out families lived in the still-standing parts of the shelter.

In the 1980s, an attempt to build high-rise flats on the area was blocked by the Cultural Heritage Office, who added The Wiesenburg to their list of protected buildings. Parts of the remaining buildings fell into disrepair, artists and craftspeople people moved in and repaired the rooms for their own purposes. Spiegel online described the Wiesenburg in 2015 as "a dreamy place... a secret tip. Crumbing walls, wild vines fall over empty windows, a birch tree spreads its roots into a stairway, mysterious doors. (...) A Swedish artist from Stockholm has his studio here, and dancers practise for their performances, an artist builds his wooden sculptures. There is a music studio, a concert room and a huge, wild garden. The city has few such places that are so enchanting."

== Cultural activities ==
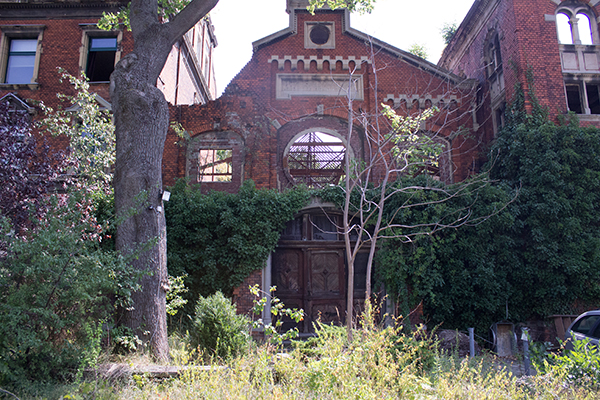
Entrance to the men's shelter with converted round window for the Night of Broken Glass (Kristallnacht) scene in Schlöndorff's The Tin Drum

Many figures from the literary and political worlds visited the Wiesenburg during the Weimar Republic to familiarise themselves with the association and become acquainted with the milieu. These visitors included Hans Fallada, whose character, Rieke Busch, a Wedding street urchin, described it as "Where the tramps and vagabonds sleep when they don't have anywhere else to stay", in his novel Ein Mann will nach oben.

The Wiesenburg was used as the setting for numerous films. Amongst others, Fritz Lang shot scenes from M and Fritz Weiss from Der Vagabund (1929). In November 1978, the men's reception hall served as the setting for the fire at the Danzig synagogue (also designed by Georg Toebelmann) during the Night of Broken Glass (Kristallnacht) in Volker Schlöndorff's The Tin Drum. In the same year, scenes from Hans Fallada's Ein Mann will nach oben and in 1981, Rainer Werner Fassbinder's Lili Marleen were filmed here.

== Planned renovation and reconstruction ==
After a lengthy dispute about the association's legal succession to the Wiesenburg, the courts eventually decided that it belonged to the Berlin state, who transferred it on 1 April 2014 to their municipal housing association, degewo. At the end of March 2015, they informed the tenants that they would soon close off large parts of the complex as they were no longer secure and were in danger of collapse. The residents protested against this closure of areas that had developed over the years into spaces for art, culture and out-of-school educational locations for pupils in the district. Nationwide press coverage followed. At the beginning of April 2015, degewo announced that current tenants would not be required to move out and that each step of the reconstruction would be carried out in dialogue with them.

In October 2015, the "Soziale Stadt" (Social City) committee of the district council held its meeting in the Wiesenburg and unanimously agreed that the association, Die Wiesenburg e.V., and the QM (neighbourhood management) Pankstraße should be involved in the planning and development stages. The association produced a development concept which was highly recommended in the committee meeting and selected for the 'Players of Change' conference for innovative urban development ideas in Holzmarkt, Berlin.

At the end of November/beginning of December 2015, degewo closed all studios and workshops – again because of an alleged possibility of collapse. Discussions between degewo and the tenants' statistician and lawyer reversed this decision and they were able to move back in three weeks later. Since January 2016, degewo has continued to carry out further safety measures so that the current activities on the site can continue without danger to life and limb.

In 2018, degewo plan to start construction of around a hundred flats in the 'garden' (the previous site of the men's and women's dormitories). The former reception halls of the men's and the women's shelters will become spaces for cultural activities, and part of the garden will become a 'green classroom'. The studios and workshops will remain and be renovated to a basic standard to avoid sudden high rent rises for the current tenants.

== Update 2023 ==
Degewo completed the construction 102 flats in 2021 on the site of the former garden and the Wiesenburg welcomed many new 'Wiesenburgers'. Now the remaining part of the former shelter stands before renovations that start this year and will hopefully be completed by 2026. The Wiesenburg e.V. continues to be a partner in all relevant discussions and planning. As was to be expected, plans have undergone some changes but the Wiesenburg will still emerge from these renovations as a space for culture, handwork, education and social activities.
