= Homelessness in Portugal =

Homeless people in Portugal
Year	Pop.	±% p.a.
2009	2,133	—
2016	3,396	+6.87%
2018	6,014	+33.08%
2019	7,107	+18.17%
2020	8,209	+15.51%
2021	9,604	+16.99%
2022	10,773	+12.17%
2023	13,128	+21.86%
2024	14,476	+10.27%

According to a national survey conducted in 2020, there were 8,209 homeless people in Portugal. Most of these lived in Lisbon, where 4,785 homeless people were accounted for, representing 58.3 percent of the total, followed by the metropolitan area of Porto (AMP) with 1,213 people. It is said that the most worrying situation is in the region of Alentejo, in the municipalities of Alvito and Beja, which have 11.35 and 9.72 homeless people per 100,000 inhabitants respectively. Out of the homeless population, the majority are men aged 45 to 64 years, who have been homeless for up to one year. The main causes are associated with dependence on alcohol or psychoactive substances (2,442), unemployment or job insecurity (2,347) or financial insufficiency associated with other reasons (2,017). Despite this being the generic characterisation of the homeless population, there were also 734 couples. In AML, the vast majority of these couples (339 out of 392) are homeless, but live in temporary accommodation centres, specific accommodation for homeless people or in rooms paid for by social services or other entities. In the country, just over half of the homeless people live in these options (4,789), but there are still 3,420 homeless, who live on the streets, in emergency shelters or in precarious places.

The report also indicates the number of people who left living on the streets and obtained permanent housing, and that last year there were 485 cases, 39% more compared to 2019. The survey promoted by ENIPSSA resulted from a survey of the 278 municipalities in mainland Portugal and reflects the 275 responses obtained, through the articulation of different institutions with local intervention. With a response rate of 99 percent, this is the most complete survey since 2018. In a statement, the Ministry of Labour, Solidarity and Social Security states that there was an increase in the number of homeless people compared to the previous year, which it justifies with the “improvement in the diagnosis process throughout the country” and adds, “The Government has been committed to providing housing solutions for homeless people, in an approach that puts housing first and, from then on, working on their social inclusion and autonomy”.

Currently, there is no official information on Portuguese homelessness in the national level, but a 2013 one-night survey conducted in Porto found 300 people sleeping on the street and 1,300 in temporary accommodation and initial unapproved data from the Social Security Institute shows that there were 4,420 people recorded in “active homeless situations” in 2013. Portugal’s 2009-2016 strategy for tackling homelessness has received criticism due to a lack of political support, transparency and funding allocation.

By 2024, more than 14,400 lived in a situation of homelessness in Portugal, according to recent data.
