= Homelessness in India =

Major social issue in India

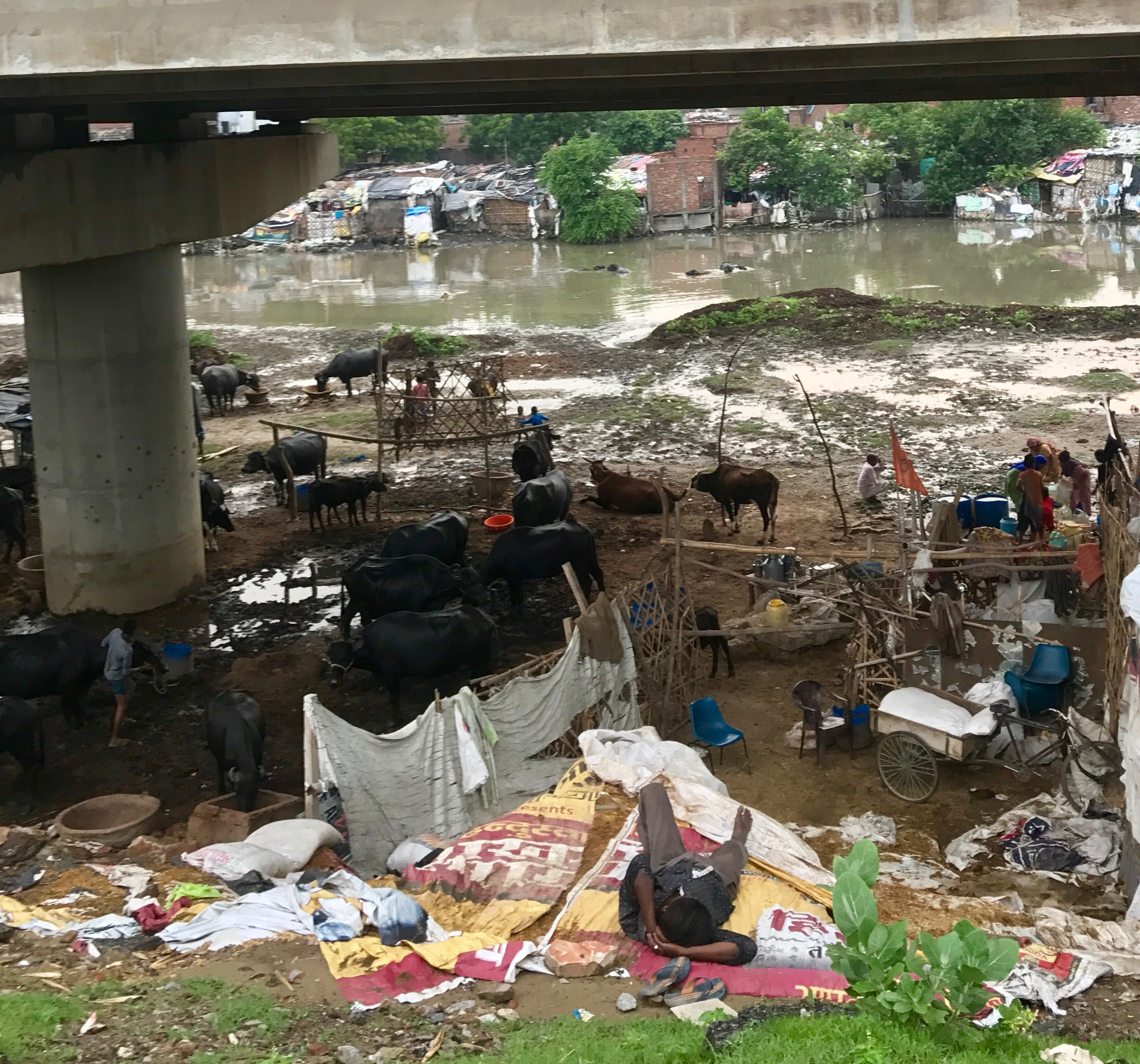
Homeless man sleeping under a bridge in India

Homelessness is a major issue in India. The Universal Declaration of Human Rights defines 'homeless' as those who do not live in a regular residence. The United Nations Economic and Social Council Statement has a broader definition for homelessness; it defines homelessness as follows: ‘When we are talking about housing, we are not just talking about four walls and a roof. The right to adequate housing is about security of tenure, affordability, access to services and cultural adequacy. It is about protection from forced eviction and displacement, fighting homelessness, poverty and exclusion. India defines 'homeless' as those who do not live in Census houses, but rather stay on pavements, roadsides, railway platforms, staircases, temples, streets, in pipes, or other open spaces. There are 1.77 million homeless people in India, or 0.15% of the country's total population, according to the 2011 census consisting of single men, women, mothers, the elderly, and the disabled. However, it is argued that the numbers are far greater than accounted by the point in time method. For example, while the Census of 2011 counted 46,724 homeless individuals in Delhi, the Indo-Global Social Service Society counted them to be 88,410, and another organization called the Delhi Development Authority counted them to be 150,000. Furthermore, there is a high proportion of mentally ill and street children in the homeless population. There are 18 million street children in India, the largest number of any country in the world, with 11 million being urban. In the lead-up to the 2010 Commonwealth Games, many temporary housing units in Delhi were demolished, leading to an increase in homelessness. That number was estimated to be around three million homeless people in Delhi alone; the same population in Canada would make up approximately 30 electoral districts. A family of four homeless members has an average of five homeless generations in India. This shows that homelessness in India is not situational but often inherited for many generations.

There is a shortage of 18.78 million houses in the country. Total number of houses has increased from 52.06 million to 78.48 million (as per 2011 census). However, the country still ranks as the 124th wealthiest country in the world as of 2003. More than 90 million people in India make less than US$1 per day, thus setting them below the global poverty threshold. The ability of the Government of India to tackle urban homelessness and poverty may be affected in the future by both external and internal factors. The number of people living in slums in India has more than doubled in the past two decades and now exceeds the entire population of Britain, the Indian Government has announced. About 78 million people in India live in slums and tenements. 17% of the world's slum dwellers reside in India. Subsequent to the release of Slumdog Millionaire in 2008, Mumbai was a slum tourist destination for slumming where homeless people and slum dwellers alike could be openly viewed by tourists.

== Causes ==
Homelessness is in part a direct result of families migrating from rural to urban cities and urbanization. Migration to urban areas can occur for a variety of reasons ranging from loss of land, need for sustainable employment, lack of clean water and other resources, and in some cases like the Bargi Dam Project, loss of all property and complete displacement. Once reaching cities, homeless attempt to create shelters out of tin, cardboard, wood, and plastic. Slums can provide an escape, yet individuals often cannot afford them. Individuals experiencing homelessness may experience abuse, maltreatment, and lack of access to schools and healthcare.

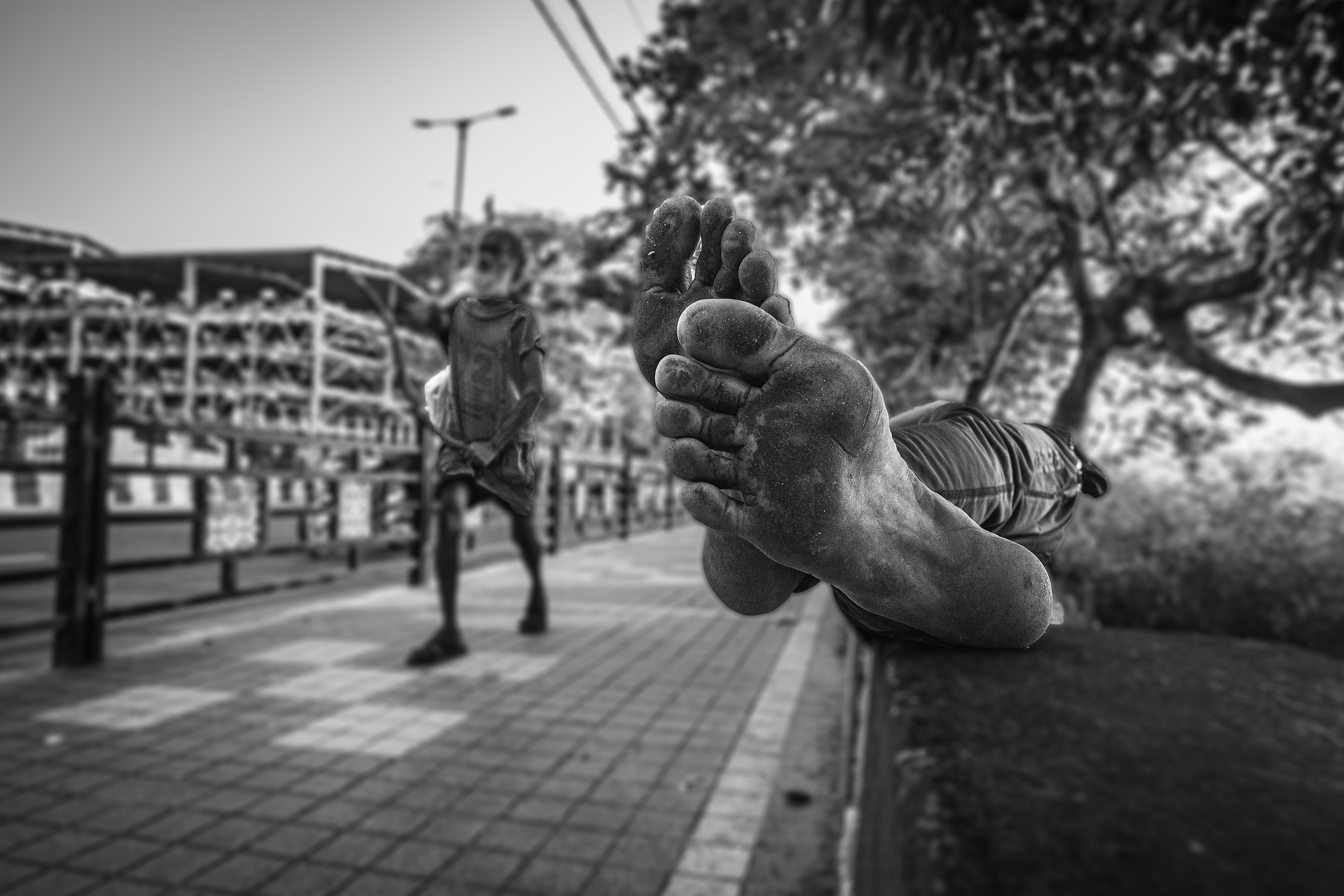
A homeless person resting on the roadside pavement in India.

Some other problems leading to homelessness include: disability (either mental, physical, or both), lack of affordable housing (a basic apartment in India costs approximately US$70 per month), unemployment (either seasonal or through economic hardships), and changes in industry. Desertion of the old, mentally ill, unmarried pregnant women, helpless divorced women and girl children also are some of the main causes of homelessness in India.

Jobs involving heavy industry and manufacturing (that require only a high school level of education) are being replaced by service industry jobs (which may or may not require a higher level of education). Since university is less affordable for the average Indian than it is for the average North American or European citizen due to their lower per capita income level, more people in India are becoming unemployable for the jobs of the 21st century. The average per capita income for a citizen of India is barely more than US$1,200; compared to US$54,510 in Canada and more than US$64,800 in Switzerland.

Policymakers attribute the following factors as the main causes of homelessness: substance use, mental illness, relationship failures, and domestic abuse. These place responsibility and blame directly on the homeless. Policies related to ‘deinstitutionalization of care for mentally ill people and subsequent abandonment of a family member with mental illness by the family’ have also increased the number of people living without a roof over their heads.

== Street children ==
Street children fall under the broader category of children in especially difficult circumstances (CEDC), and are considered the most threatened of all children in CEDC. It is estimated that there are more than 400,000 street children in India. According to UNICEF, street children can be broken up into four sections: at-risk children who live with family but work on the streets for income, children who primarily stay on the street but have some residence with family, children who spend most of their lives on the street and do not live with or contact family, and finally abandoned children who are on their own with no adult figures. Children flee homes of poverty, violence, oppression and exploitation and eventually reside on the streets.

Children are often privy to exploitation and physical and mental abuse due to familial stress, depression, and excessive alcohol use. When they run away from their families to find a better life, children face prostitution and physical labor. Children as young as 6 sift through garbage seeking money to buy food. Furthermore, children live on the streets as a result of urbanization, poverty, unemployment, alcoholic families, death of parents, bad relationships with new parents, and drug use. Street children often have bad performance and behavior issues in school and may eventually drop out, leading to low literacy. They are stripped of their right to education and recreation. This ties into a cycle perpetuating poverty and homelessness.

Street children have more physical and mental health issues than non-street children. Assuming children will ask for bribes, hospitals abstain services, increase prices, or refuse them proper care. These issues can cause street children to become depressed or antisocial with negative approaches to life.

Street children suffer from multiple forms of abuse. Most experience verbal and psychological abuse, some experience general abuse and neglect, fewer suffer from health abuse, and a small number from physical (including sexual) abuse. Data shows that high levels of one type of abuse are correlated with high levels of another, with amount of abuse increasing with age and income. Often, abuse comes from police or manipulative employers and occupations. Additionally, studies show that boys are more abused than girls on the streets. Finally, abuse can stem from children with hierarchy on the streets. Members of a group help protect each other to survive. However, older member often abuse the younger children.

Homelessness and poverty are the main causes of child labor in India. Census 2011 reported that there nearly 43.5 lakh children aged 5–14 years work to support themselves and their families. According to UNICEF, nearly 12% of all of India's children are laborers. In many cases, poor parents have no choice but to send their children to work in unsafe and hazardous conditions.

== Challenges faced by the homeless ==
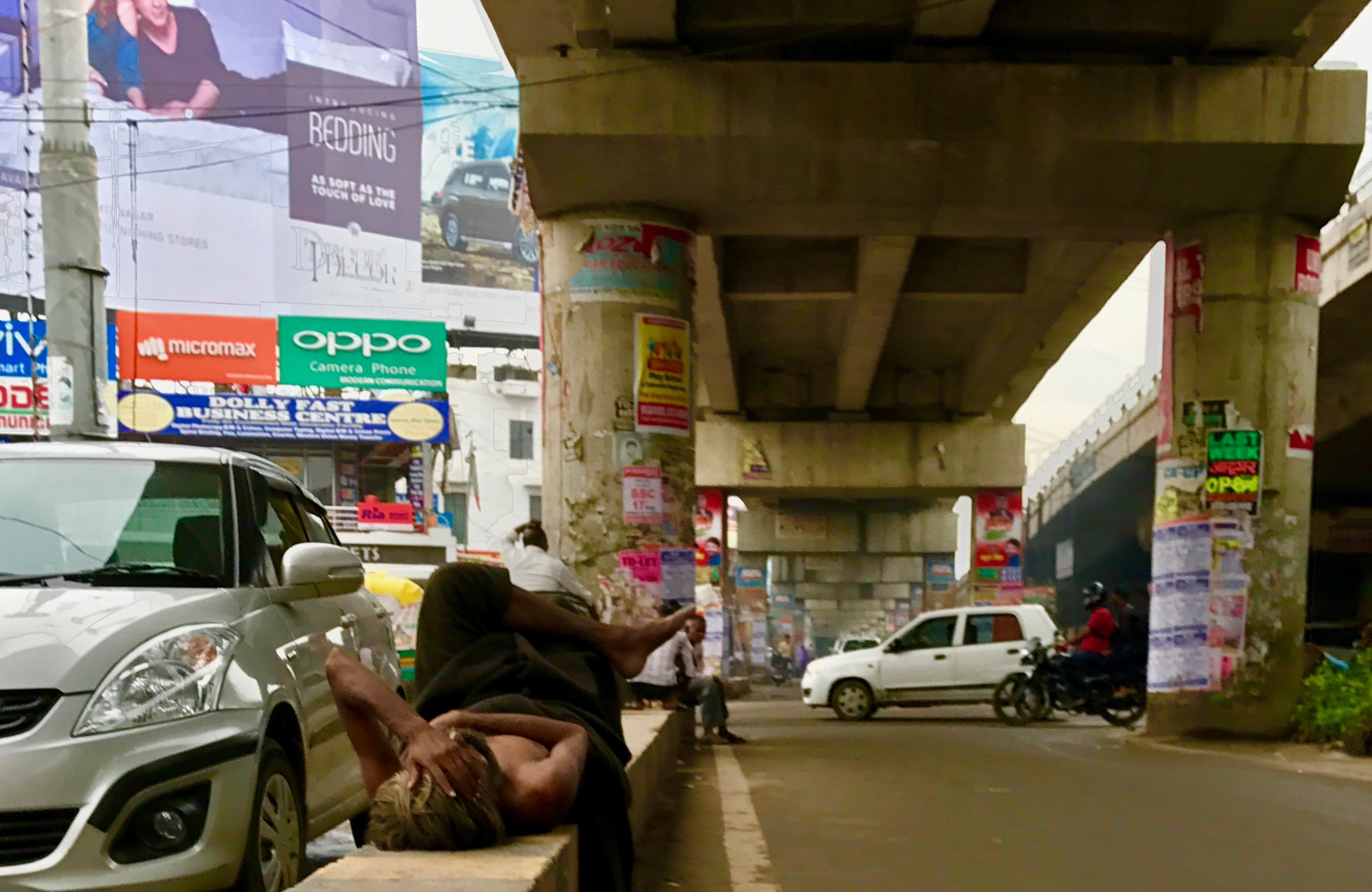
Homeless man sleeping on a bench in India.

One challenge the homeless face is the inaccessibility to shelters. Although shelters are available for the homeless in certain cities, many homeless people choose to not utilize them and live on the streets instead due to various different reasons. One reason is that homeless individuals who are affected by mobility issues cannot access them and are unsure about how shelters function. Another is that sometimes shelters are located in unreachable areas and have “camouflaged architecture and poor layouts of the interiors”. Shelters often lack funding and resources to make them more attractive for the homeless population. Shelters also demand a small fee per night, immediately rendering them inaccessible for many homeless. The homeless may view shelters as crowded spaces with poor sanitation where drug addicts and thieves may also take refuge. Sometimes shelters do not allow individuals to bring personal belongings with them which is another factor that discourages homeless individuals from using the shelters. Furthermore, shelter officials, managers, and caretakers are not incentivized to keep the shelters clean and welcoming. Temporary shelters also run the risk of being demolished and often force the homeless to change location of stay.

Another challenge faced by the homeless is exposure to extreme weather in summer and winter. A study found that between January 2005 and December 2009, seven homeless individuals passed away every day in Delhi. Their deaths were not recorded by the police and they also did not receive a funeral.

Homeless people also suffer from bad health and extremely limited access to medical facilities. Some of the reasons include: lack of proper identity documents required by medical facilities, cost, and inclination of health care providers to outright reject them. In 2010, the UNDP India conducted a survey that found that only about 3% of the homeless people possessed a voter ID or ration card.

== Efforts to assist ==
=== Governmental services ===
After India gained independence in 1947, the nation created its own set of Five-Year Plans for economic development. The state did not develop any programs for dealing with the poor and the homeless until the Eighth-Five Year plan (1992–97). In this plan, the Footpath Dwellers Night Shelter Scheme (NSS) was created and funds of INR 2.27 crores were allocated for two years. The 10th plan (2002-2007) asked NGOs to creates homes for the homeless and also recognized that the homeless were not being addressed by the government to an extent that they should have been. The 11th plan (2007–12) declared access to roof over one's head as a “fundamental right”. The 12th plan (2012–17) promoted the creation and development of night shelters for beggars and the aged; it also gave city planners the responsibility to build and provide spaces for the homeless.

The Housing and Urban Development Corporation (HUDCO) had a policy for the homeless known as Night Shelters for Urban Shelterless, applicable to urban areas in 1988 to 1989. It gave 20,000 rupees a year to homeless shelters, 50% paid by the government, 50% paid by loans from HUDCO or sponsors. In 1992, the Ministry of Urban Development renamed it to Shelter and Sanitation Facilities for Footpath Dwellers in Urban Areas. The department decided to maintain these shelters as dorm-like refuge for nights and social areas in the day. However, in 2005 it was discontinued as states lacked funding.

The Government of India has formed new policies for affordable housing and shelters in urban areas in the past few decades. However, shelters provide a temporary solution as they are not permanent and do not replace the right to housing. According to the Commissioners of the Supreme Court, a shelter is a covered space where homeless people can feel safe and secure, and is accessible by anyone. It should provide protection from the environment, safety and security, a place to keep belongings, and a place to drink water and use sanitary bathrooms. The government states that homeless shelters ideally be in localities where there are a lot of homeless people. To improve infrastructures in slums, the Supreme court mandated a new mission known as the Jawaharlal Nehru National Urban Renewal Mission. This stated that for cities of over 5 lakhs in population size, shelters must contain good water, toilets, baths, cooling, heating, ventilation, lights, emergency lights, fire safety, recreation spaces, TVs, first aid, shelter from mosquitoes and rodents, beds, kitchens and utensils, counseling, childcare facilities, and transport for emergencies.

However, the 2010 report by Commissioners of the Supreme Court portrayed conditions in night time shelters as horrendous. According to the court, these shelters are barely an improvement from the streets. The homeless population eligible cannot enjoy the shelters at night as that is their time of employment, thus defeating the purpose of the shelter. Furthermore, the data collected from survey analysis of homeless shelters showed the following: the shelters are majority male consisting of wage workers, taxi and rickshaw drivers, and tourists. The lack of women in shelters suggests that either women don't find shelters helpful or that there is low tendency for families to seek shelters. The shelters have inadequate bedding, water, bathrooms, tools, gas for cooking, rodent control, activity space and non-functional first aid. Additionally, there is bad lighting, ventilation, and fire safety. Women and children do not have their own shelters. Thus, the bare minimum of government demands are not being met.

In response to this report, the Supreme Court mandated there be one shelter to house 100 people in a population. They declared that shelters must be run all day, every day of the year and consist of beds, bathrooms, water, healthcare and first aid services. 62 cities participated in this. Finally, in 2013 the Indian government started the National Urban Livelihood Mission program which mandated guidelines for states on how to create and utilize shelters.

The Public Distribution System (PDS) is one of the major services offered by the government to people living below the poverty line (BPL) in India. This system provides food and grains for low income families at a cheaper rate. However, it requires identity documents to determine eligibility, which many homeless people lack. Although programs like the Aashray Adhikar Abhiyan and NGOs like Pehchan in Mumbai work with the homeless in obtaining documentation of identity, only about 3% of the homeless people in India have identity proof, meaning that most are excluded from becoming beneficiaries of the BPL.

=== Non-governmental services ===
Indian NGOs have increased dramatically over the years for a number of reasons. A few of these reasons include: programs developed by governmental organizations often lack "sufficient financial means for implementation", lack of discourse around urban issues at Indian universities, and the gap between social classes in urban areas.

Drop in centers have shown to help street children. In capitals and large cities, NGOs are involved with these centers. One such organization known as Salam Baalak Trust (SBT) has been operating in Delhi since 1989. SBT runs four homeless shelters open 24 hours a day for around 220 children at a time. This organization has helped 3,500 street children. SBT shelters offer free clothing, food, education, health and mental health services. Thus, children can play without worrying about adult responsibilities such as acquiring food. Furthermore, SBT shelters are safe and secure for children. Centers provide support systems with non-judgmental staff and supervisors as well as opportunities for growth. As many children often do not get support from their parents, families or others on the streets, children seek trust in the staff and consider them to be family. They learn good morals and habits, including reduced drug use and hygiene. Additionally, they are taught how to utilize their skills to create a business. Children at drop in centers believe they have more opportunities for success in the future.

However, some children do not realize that they will have to adapt to non-street life in drop in centers. They get accustomed to the freedom on the streets, including drug use and playing with friends at their leisure. If their families live on the streets, the streets become a normal home for them. Some children also do not like the rules of the shelter. Thus, they chose against living in drop in centers.

Many NGOs working in housing sector utilize “self-help techniques” that can be viewed in two perspectives; one is that NGOs can work to “overcome the lack of funds and still be able to do something”; and the other is that NGOs can work to spread awareness about issues related to homelessness and help make people more “conscious”. Some advantages that NGOs have are: “flexibility and possibility to experiment; high sensitivity to local problems; a good rapport with the people involved in the project; opportunities to make use of mutual help; aid of international organizations (expertise); inspiring enthusiasm; possibilities to tackle controversial issues”. However, NGOs that implement shelter projects are limited to what they can do because the location of the project always impacts the quality of the shelter, something that is out of the NGO's control.

== Homelessness and informal housing: the case of Mumbai ==
Mumbai, located in one of the most populous states, Maharashtra, is home to 12.47 million people, as per the 2011 Census. The city has an extremely high population density of 20,692 people per km^{2}, and a total area of about 603 km^{2}. It contributes to nearly 40 per cent of the state's gross domestic product and 5 per cent of the national GDP. Much of Mumbai's economy today falls under the informal sector where the average income of a worker is about Rs. 6,000 per month (equaling to about 120 US dollars).

The population of Mumbai dramatically increased from 1.69 million in 1930 to 8 million in 1970 due to people moving from rural areas. Migrants move to the city when working in a rural area does not supply enough income to support their families. In the city, employers are more attracted to migrants than local workers because migrant workers supply labor at a cheaper cost and are more willing to work in unsafe conditions.

However, an income of less than Rs. 6,000 leaves many migrant workers without access to clean drinking water and basic amenities. Many are not able to pay for rent and thus are forced to live in pavements, streets, parks, and other open public spaces. One study showed that nearly 60 percent of the homeless of Mumbai are from migrants from other states, and most in this category moved from rural areas. Most of them work in the informal sector as laborers and live without a permanent home. Many of these migrants do not have any sort of identity documents and thus are not registered for social welfare benefits such as the Public Distribution System. These migrants originally worked on agricultural lands that they did not own themselves; they moved to Mumbai in search of a better livelihood - better roads, better access to clean drinking water, better roads, better sustenance. Many left their villages to escape “caste-based violence” that destroyed their ability to make a living.

A smaller portion of migrant laborers are able to afford to live in slums. Today, more than half of Mumbai's population, nearly 5.5 million people, lives in slums which make up only 8% of the land. Slums suffer from overcrowding, tight spaces, poor lighting, lack of electricity, scarcity of clean water, and unhygienic conditions. Slum inhabitants also suffer from housing insecurities resulting from pressure from their landlords to pay rent on time.

In Maharashtra, several programs and policies were enacted by the government to address inadequate housing issues, especially related to slums. The Maharashtra Slum Areas (Improvement, Clearance, and Redevelopment) Act (MSAA) in 1971 was established to “improve environmental conditions” in slums by providing a range of services; it gave the government power to declare a geographical space as a “slum area” and then take action to improve it as deemed appropriate. It could ask the inhabitants of a slum to move to another space without offering alternative spaces of living. The Slum Upgrading Program, funded by the World Bank, aimed to help residents secure leases. The Maharashtra Housing and Area Development Act (MHADA) in 1976 gave the government the power to “acquire lands for carrying out the Acts’ objectives”.

The policies associated with informal housing have slowly taken a neoliberal path, as seen through the Slum Redevelopment Scheme (SRD) that involved the private sector for the redevelopment of slums.

Informal housing and homelessness remain a major issue in Mumbai as migration from rural areas continues and low incomes force people to locate to streets and pavements.

== A growing concern ==
An increasing number of migrants looking for employment and better living standards are quickly joining India's homeless population. Although non-governmental organisations are helping to relieve the homelessness crisis in India, these organisation are not enough to solve the entire problem. Attempts at gentrifying India's problematic neighbourhoods is also bringing homelessness levels up. Laws passed by the Municipal Corporation of Mumbai during the 1970s and the 1980s were held by the Indian Courts to be violations of people's right to life in addition to their right to a decent livelihood. A landmark case in 1986, however, would result in the favour of the homeless masses of India. The first decade of the 21st century would see 75,000 people kicked out of Sanjay Gandhi National Park with the government using a massive military force of helicopters and heavily armed police officers.
