= Homelessness in Hungary =

There are estimated to be 30,000 homeless people in Hungary. 131 homeless people died of hypothermia in Budapest between 2006 and 2010.

After repeated attempts by the Fidesz government to make homelessness a criminal offence, and with homeless people in many cities facing severe restrictions imposed by local ordinances, a law banning homelessness was introduced in June 2018. Since the law took effect, about 200 homeless people have received police warnings and at least four have been arrested. Thus far, the courts have dealt with the homeless people brought before them by handing down formal cautions.

Various Hungarian nongovernmental organizations, notably a group named The City is For All, have protested against the new law, calling it "inhumane".
