= Homelessness in Denmark =

Homelessness is considered a significant social issue in Denmark. Since 2007, comprehensive counts have been performed every other year in week six (early February). The latest, from 2017, counted 6,635 homeless people in Denmark. The total number of people experiencing homelessness at some point in 2017 was estimated at 13,000, while earlier estimates have placed it between 10,000 and 15,000. Roughly half the homeless are in the Capital Region. When compared to many other countries, such as the United States, the rate of homelessness in Denmark is significantly lower, which has been linked to the relatively comprehensive welfare system.

The number of homeless people in Denmark has risen in recent decades, but this has been most pronounced in people that are between 18 and 29 years old (although 30 to 59 years old remains the largest age group, at 70%), women (although men remains the largest group, at 75%) and immigrants (although Danish citizens remain the largest group). Among the foreign, a high percentage are Eastern or Southern European men that seek work in Denmark. Many of these only stay in Denmark during the summer, returning to their respective countries during the relatively cold Danish winter.

Based on the comprehensive count in February 2017, roughly one-tenth of homeless people in Denmark are "street sleepers" (which also includes people sleeping in stairways, sheds and other places not intended for human habitation), with the remaining sleeping in the homes of friends/family, in hotels/hostels, in shelters or alike. The number of street sleepers is higher during the summer, and homeless foreigners are overrepresented among them. Among homeless in Denmark, the primary issue is psychiatric disease at 36% (24% receive treatment), drug addiction at 27% (17% receive treatment) and alcohol addiction at 23% (9% receive treatment). Overall it is estimated that more than half of all homeless people have mental health issues. Compared to many other countries such as the United States, a higher percentage of Denmark's homeless have mental health issues or substance abuse, as countries with weaker welfare systems tend to have higher homeless rates but the homeless will more likely to include from a wide range of groups.

The government of Denmark's approach to homelessness include commissioning national surveys on homelessness during the last decade that allow for direct comparison between Denmark, Norway and Sweden. The three countries have very similar definitions of homelessness, with minor variations.

== See also ==
- Hus Forbi – A monthly newspaper sold by homeless people
