= Homelessness in Israel =

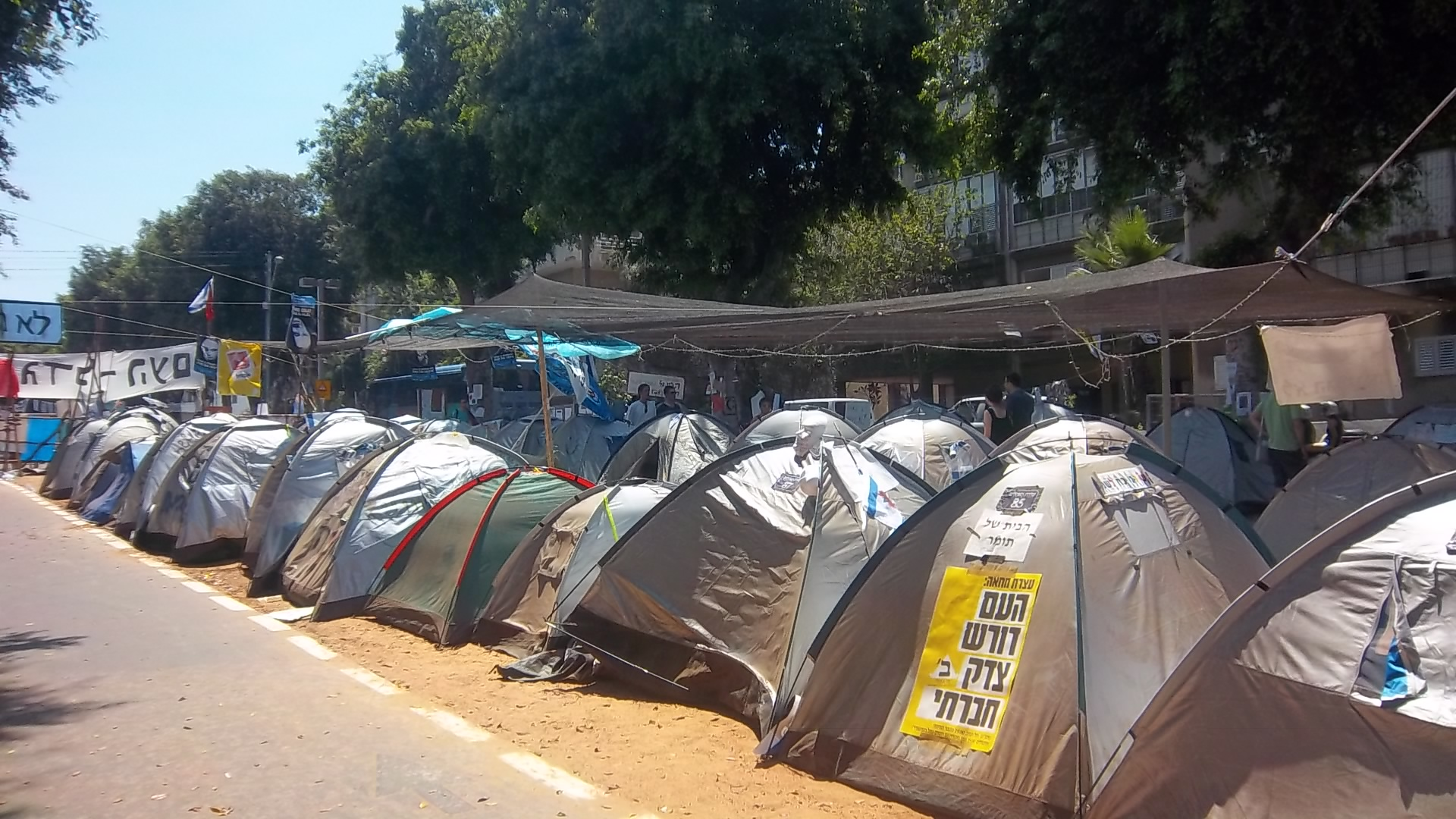
Housing protest on Rothschild Boulevard, Tel Aviv, 2011

Homelessness in Israel is a phenomenon that mostly developed after the mid-1980s.

Homelessness increased following the wave of Soviet immigration in 1991. As many as 70 percent of homeless people in Tel Aviv are immigrants from the former Soviet Union, nearly all of them men. According to homeless shelter founder Gilad Harish, "when the recession hit Israel in the early 90s, the principle of 'last in, first out' kicked in, and many Russian immigrants lost their jobs. Being new to the country, they didn't have a strong family support system to fall back on like other Israelis do. Some ended up on the street with nowhere to go."

The number of homeless people in Israel grew in the 2000s, and the Association for Civil Rights in Israel claimed that the authorities were ignoring the issue.

Some 2,000 families in Israel lose their homes every year after defaulting on their mortgage loans. However, a law amendment passed in 2009 protects the rights of mortgage debtors and ensures that they are not evicted after failing to meet mortgage payments. The amendment is part of a wider reform in the law in the wake of a lengthy battle by the Association for Civil Rights in Israel and other human rights groups.

In 2007, the number of homeless youth was on the rise. More than 25% of all homeless youth in 2007 were girls, compared to 15% in 2004. A report by Elem, a non-profit organization that helps youth at risk, pointed to a 5% rise in the number of youths either homeless or wandering the streets late at night while their parents worked or due to strained relations at home. The organization estimated that in 2007 it provided programs or temporary shelter to roughly 32,000 youths in some 30 locations countrywide.

In 2014, the number of homeless individuals in Israel was estimated at 1,831, about 600 of whom were living on the streets of Tel Aviv. This makes up 0.02% of the country's population, a low figure compared to other developed nations. In July 2015, the Welfare Ministry estimated the number of homeless to be between 800 and 900, including 450 receiving services and treatment from their municipalities but continuing to live on the streets. Elem claimed the true figure was much higher. In December 2015, a large study by the Welfare Ministry found that 2,300 people in Israel were homeless.

Homeless people in Israel are entitled to a monthly government stipend of NIS 1,000. In addition, there are both state-run homeless shelters operated by the Welfare Ministry and privately run shelters.

Adi Nes, an Israeli photographer, has brought public attention to the issue by taking pictures of Israel's homeless.

The Twelve-Day War had left at least 15,000 Israelis homeless as of 24 June 2025.
