= Homelessness in Spain =

Homelessness is a serious socioeconomic issue that affects 40,000 people in Spain (0.09% of the population). The country suffered greatly from COVID-19 and the accompanying economic downturn, is likewise grappling with a huge rural population decline problem. Immigrants make up a disproportionate number of the homeless population. There are a lot of young people who are homeless; according to some estimates, 30% of Spain's homeless are between the ages of 18 and 29. Just 5% of the country's population, according to Spain's Research Institute for Depopulation and Development of Rural Areas, resides there. Homelessness and public begging are not officially forbidden under Spanish law.

The number of people living in dangerous and subpar housing has significantly expanded as a result of the economic and financial crisis. The issue at hand no longer solely affects one nation in the world. The majority of nations are attempting to solve this issue in some form. Because of increased unemployment and declining wages, more people are unable to afford housing costs, increasing their risk of being homeless.

== Statistics ==
According to the most recent statistics gathered by the Spanish National Institute of Statistics, the country's homeless population has increased by 25% during the previous ten years. More than 28,500 persons will be affected by this social issue in 2022, up from 22,900 in 2012. In Spain, those in this circumstance are 42.7 years old on average. Statistics in Europe don't appear to be any better. Almost 700,000 people in Europe experience homelessness every day (and night), according to the European Parliament, who draws attention to their insecure living conditions. In just ten years, there has been a 70% growth.

== Reasons ==
Reasons of becoming homeless:

- Homelessness may be caused by numerous circumstances. These can also be personal or familial, such as divorce, mourning times, mental illness, domestic violence, or drug misuse. There are structural elements at play as well, including discrimination, unemployment (or unstable employment), and trouble finding cheap housing (Trenado).
- Another factor contributing to people's homelessness is the state of their families. In this group, 24.9% of respondents claim to be in a relationship, and 50% of them live together. 11.0% of people are married, 23.0% are divorcing or living apart, 63.7% are single, and 2.3% are widowed. Ten percent of those who are homeless are parents.
- The European Federation of National Organizations working with the Homeless (FEANTSA) emphasizes institutional elements that may contribute to homelessness, such as a lack of coordination between agencies or an improperly designed assistance system.

=== Changes ===
Changes in the number of individuals living on the streets:

- More than 28,500 persons will be affected by this social issue in 2022, up from 22,900 in 2012. In Spain, those in this circumstance are 42.7 years old on average (Trenado).
- The effects of the economic and financial crises, as well as increased unemployment, have left many individuals unable to afford adequate accommodation.
- 51.1% of homeless people are under the age of 45, 43.3% are between the ages of 45 and 64, and 5.5% are above the age of 64. 42.9 years old is the average age. Spanish nationality makes up 50.1%, while foreign nationality makes up 49.9%.
- 93.3% of Spaniards and 75.8% of foreigners, respectively, are registered with a municipality. African nationality makes up 53.3% of them, followed by American (25.9%) and European (16.7%) nationalities. Foreigners who are homeless and in Spain account for 43.1% of the population (Wanger).
- Hence, a total of 28,552 people received aid in shelters in 2022: 21,900 men and 6,652 women. 76.7% of those who are homeless are men (Wanger).

=== Modification in the characteristics of the homeless ===
- 24.9% of those in this group claim to have a partner, and of those who do, half of them say they live together. 11.0% of people are married, 23.0% are divorcing or living apart, 63.7% are single, and 2.3% are widowed. Ten percent of those who are homeless are parents (Wanger).
- There is evidence that the socioeconomic makeup of the homeless population is changing. A rising percentage of households are having issues with homelessness.
- In Barcelona, a new category of homeless people has been discovered: those with unstable jobs who must live in shelters because of the high cost of rent.
- A total of 77.5% of the population lived with their parents until the age of 18, 10.7% exclusively with one parent, 5.8% with grandparents or other family members, 3.9% in a shelter, and 2.2% with strangers.
- 20% of homeless people claim that up to the age of 18, there were no significant issues or conflicts in their family.
- Women make up 10-11 percent of Spain's homeless population.

=== Strategies and policies ===
- The Ministry is now working with numerous NGOs to develop and implement the first Spanish National Homelessness Strategy, which the Parliament authorized in April 2014.
- Making homeless persons visible to public systems is crucial if we want to prevent cancer from striking them. With this objective in mind, a number of Spanish, Greek, Austrian, and British organizations have just joined forces with FEANTSA to begin the EU-funded Cancer less pilot project (Trenado).

=== Comments on important policy developments ===
- Life on the streets will become much more challenging in Spain.
- The Spanish Congress is about to approve a public security bill designed to control and penalize street behavior, including penalties for the homeless.
- The national government is rejecting a variety of municipal, regional, and national solutions proposed by various public authority levels and political parties in an effort to stop evictions and their impacts.
- Nongovernmental organizations in Spain are worried that this could lead to fines for those who are homeless and who sleep on park benches or sit on street corners.
- Priorities of a comprehensive, four-year strategy that has formed in Barcelona include recognizing the rights of the homeless, providing access to healthcare, minimizing overcrowding in homeless shelters, and improving society perceptions of the city's homeless.
- This is made even more heartbreaking when we realize that one in three fatalities of those who are homeless are caused by conditions that may have been prevented with prompt access to quality healthcare (Trenado).
