= Ahead of My Time (song) =

2000 song performed by Teddybears

Single by Teddybears featuring Daddy Boastin'

from the album Rock 'n' Roll Highschool and Soft Machine
- Released: 2000
- Genre: electronic rock, dub, reggae
- Length: 4:10
- Songwriters: Klas Åhlund, Joakim Åhlund, Patrik Arve, Daddy Boastin'

Teddybears featuring Daddy Boastin' singles chronology
"Yours to Keep" (1999)	"Ahead of My Time" (2000)	"Punkrocker" (2001)

"Ahead of My Time" is a song performed by Teddybears featuring Daddy Boastin'. The song was released on their 2000 album Rock 'n' Roll Highschool, and reissued on their 2006 album Soft Machine. It was released as a single in 1999.

== Content ==
Teddybears use heavily distorted guitar riffs and dub reggae beats which are incorporated into the song.

== Track listing ==
CD single

1. "Ahead of My Time " (featuring Daddy Boastin') – 4:10

== In the media ==
- In 2009, Telus used the track "Ahead of My Time" in their 'Downtime' TV advertisement.
- In the movie, The Air I Breathe (2007)
- In a series of Telus commercials, Canada-Wide, spring 2009
- In the TV series Life season 1 episode 11 (2007)
