= Elephant Man discography =

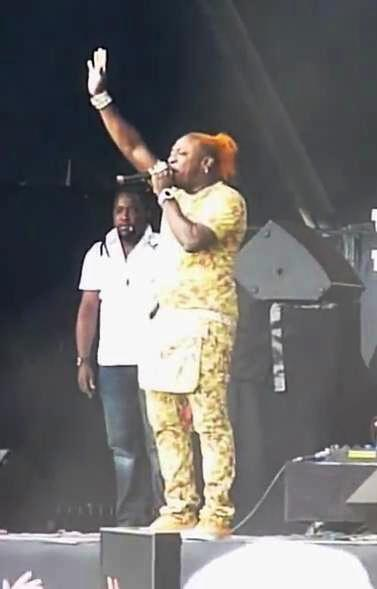
- Elephant Man live in 2013.
- Studio albums: 8
- Singles: 9
- Music videos: 13
- Collaborative albums: 1
- Extended plays: 1

This is the discography of Jamaican musician Elephant Man.

== Albums ==
=== Studio albums ===
List of albums, with selected chart positions
Title	Album details	Peak chart positions		
Title	Album details	Top Independent Albums	Top Reggae Albums	Top R&B Albums
Scooby Away	Released: September 25, 2000; Label: Greensleeves Records; Format: Cassette, CD	-	-	-
Comin' For You	Released: October 17, 2000; Label: Greensleeves Records; Format: Cassette, CD, digital download	-	-	-
Log On	Released: November 13, 2001; Label: Greensleeves Records; Format: CD, digital download	32	2	-
Higher Level	Released: November 12, 2002; Label: Greensleeves Records; Format: CD, digital download	-	12	-
Good 2 Go	Released: December 2, 2003; Label: VP Records, Atlantic; Format: CD, digital download	-	1	14
Monsters Of Dancehall	Released: February 20, 2007; Label: Greensleeves Records; Format: CD, digital download	-	-	-
Let's Get Physical	Released: April 8, 2008; Label: Bad Boy Entertainment, VP Records; Format: CD, digital download	-	1	38
Dance & Sweep	Released: February 14, 2011; Label: VP Records; Format: CD, digital download	-	14	-

=== Compilation albums ===
List of albums, with selected details
Title	Album details
Scare Dem Crew Scared from the Crypt	Released: October 19, 1999; Label: TVT Records, Blunt Recordings; Format: Cassette, CD

=== Extended plays ===
List of albums, with year released
Title	Album details
Out Of Control	Released: TBA; Label: TBA; Formats: digital download

== Singles ==
=== As lead artist ===
List of singles, with selected chart positions, showing year released and album name
Year	Title	Chart positions			Album
Year	Title	US Hot 100	US R&B/Hip-Hop	Hot Rap Tracks	Album
2002	"Log On"	–	–	–	Log On
2003	"Pon De River"	86	68	19	Good 2 Go
2003	"Signal De Plane"	–	68	–	Good 2 Go
2004	"Jook Gal" (featuring Twista, YoungBloodZ, Lil Jon and Kiprich)	57	20	15	Good 2 Go
2007	"Five-O" (featuring Wyclef Jean)	–	87	–	Let's Get Physical
2007	"Willie Bounce"	–	51	–	Let's Get Physical
2009	"Nuh Linga"	–	84	–	Dance & Sweep
2009	"Party Up in Here"	–	-	–	Dance & Sweep
2013	"Miley Cyrus (Twerk)"	–	–	–	Out Of Control
2014	All The Way (featuring Spice)	–	–	–	Out Of Control
2014	"Jamaicans How We Do It"	–	-	–	Out Of Control
2014	"Shmoney Dance"	–	-	–	Out Of Control
2019	Find It	—	—	—	

=== As featured artist ===
List of singles, with selected chart positions, showing year released and album name
Year	Title	Chart positions				Album
Year	Title	U.S.	US R&B/Hip-Hop	CAN	US Dance	Album
2004	"Get Low (Remix)" (Lil Jon featuring Ying Yang Twins, Elephant Man & Busta Rhymes)	2	1	1	10	Part II
2006	"U Sexy Girl" (Fatman Scoop Featuring Elephant Man and Jabba)	-	93	-	-	In the Club
2007	"Whine Up" (Kat DeLuna featuring Elephant Man)	29	–	15	1	9 Lives
2007	"China Wine" (Sun featuring Wyclef Jean, Elephant Man and Tony Matterhorn)	–	–	–	–	Carnival Vol. II: Memoirs of an Immigrant
2007	"Shake That Body" (Paul P.I. Ingram featuring Elephant Man)	–	90	–	–	Non-album single
2009	"Clear! (Remix)"; Kardinal Offishall featuring Elephant Man	–	–	–	–	Mr. International

=== Guest appearances ===
The following is a list of songs Elephant Man appears with other artists, usually remixes:

- "All Nite (Don't Stop)" (So So Def Remix) by Janet Jackson featuring. Elephant Man
- "All Nite (Don't Stop)" (Kwamé Stimulated Remix) by Janet Jackson featuring. Elephant Man
- "Are You Feelin' It?" by the Teddybears featuring. Elephant Man - Soft Machine
- "Digydance" by Digydon featuring. Elephant Man, & MC Bacon
- "Get Low (Remix)" by Lil Jon & The Eastside Boyz featuring. Ying Yang Twins, Busta Rhymes & Elephant Man - Part II
- "Pon de Replay (Remix)" by Rihanna featuring. Elephant Man - Music of the Sun
- "Reggae Bump Bump" by R. Kelly featuring Elephant Man - TP-3: Reloaded
- "Shake (Remix)" by Ying Yang Twins featuring Pitbull & Elephant Man - Money Is Still A Major Issue
- "Switch (Reggae Remix)" by Will Smith featuring Elephant Man - Lost & Found
- "U Sexy Girl" by Fatman Scoop featuring Elephant Man & Jabba - U Sexy Girl
- "Agony (song)" (Remix) by Dub J featuring Sumeet, Broadway & Elephant Man
- "What U Gon' Do (Jamaican Remix)" by Lil Jon & The Eastside Boyz featuring Elephant Man & Lady Saw - Crunk Juice
- "Shake That Booty (Krumpa Remix)" by David Banner featuring Elephant Man - Certified
- "Shake Baby Shake (Seeed Remix)" by Seeed featuring Elephant Man - What You Deserve Is What You Get – EP
- "Ishq Naag" by RDB featuring Elephant Man - PUNJABI
- "Whine Up" by Kat DeLuna featuring Elephant Man - 9 Lives
- "Robbery (Remix)" by Killah Priest featuring Elephant Man & Savoy - Black August
- "Get Wild (Bonus Track)" by Lil Skeeter featuring Elephant Man - "Midwest Mastermind"
- "China Wine" by Sun featuring Wyclef Jean, Elephant Man and Tony Matterhorn
- "Throw Your Hands Up" by Teddybears STHLM featuring Elephant Man and Harry Toddler of Scare Dem Crew - Rock 'n' Roll Highschool
- "Money In The Bank" (Remix) by Swizz Beatz featuring Young Jeezy, Eve & Elephant Man
- "Spin Ya Rag" by Lil Jon & DJ Ideal featuring Elephant Man - The BME Mixtape
- "Kung Faux" Series by Mic Neumann featuring Elephant Man
- "Wall To Wall (Remix) by Chris Brown featuring Elephant Man
- "Umbrella (Remix) by Rihanna featuring Elephant Man
- "Pegao (Remix)" by Wisin & Yandel featuring Elephant Man - Caribbean Connection
- "Latinas" by Zion & Lennox featuring Elephant Man - Caribbean Connection
- "Cut Dem Off" by Ricky Blaze featuring Tony Matterhorn & Elephant Man
- "Satisfaction" by PUSHIM featuring Elephant Man'
- "Church Heathen" by Shaggy (Mega Mix Promo) featuring Shelly Thunder, Elephant Man, Ninjaman, Redd Foxx, Adrian Banton, Rayvon & ky)
- "Busketeer (Ghetto Yout Fi Rich)" by Kano featuring Elephant Man

== Music videos ==
Year	Title	Director(s)
2001	"Log On"	Big Daddy
2003	"Pon De River"	—
2003	"Signal De Plane"	Ras Kassa
2004	"Jook Gal"	—
2006	"Willie Bounce"	Phat Philms
2007	"Five-O"	—
2008	"Nuh Linga"	—
2009	"This Is How We Do It"	Gareth Cobran
2009	"Swing"	Terminal 4 Media
2009	"Party Un In Here"	Nordia Rose
2012	"Si Dung Pon It"	Terminal 4 Media
2012	"Dash Wata"	Terminal 4 Media
2013	"Miley Cyrus (Twerk)"	Crish Media
2014	"Jamaicans How We Do It "	Nosaki
2014	"Shmoney Dance"	Main E. Fetti
