= Dansbander (album) =

Studio album by Torgny Melins
- Released: 25 January 2006
- Genre: dansband music
- Length: circa 48 minutes
- Label: Sony BMG Music Entertainment
- Producer: Anders Bergströms, Torgny Melins

Torgny Melins chronology
Torgny Melins 15 år (1999)	Dansbander (2006)	Allting som vi har (2007)

Dansbander is a 2006 Torgny Melins studio album, consisting of recordings of Teddybears Stockholm songs. The song "Dansbander" ("Punkrocker") was also released in 2006 single together with a Teddybears Stockholm-medley acting as B-side. The album was also released as a cassette tape.

== Track listing ==
#	Title	Writer	Length
1.	Dansbander (Punkrocker)	Joakim Åhlund, Klas Åhlund, Patrik Arve	
2.	Cobrastyle	Fabian Torsson, Ewart Brown, Patrik Arve	
3.	Ahead of My Time	Joakim Åhlund, Klas Åhlund, Patrik Arve	
4.	Different Sound	Joakim Åhlund, Klas Åhlund, Patrik Arve	
5.	Hey Boy	Joakim Åhlund, Klas Åhlund, Patrik Arve, Swing Fly	
6.	Teddybears Medley (Silicon Sally, Taken by Surprise)	Teddybears	
7.	Little Stereo	Daddy Boastin', Bobby Dixon	
8.	Yours to Keep	Joakim Åhlund, Klas Åhlund, Patrik Arve	
9.	Automatic Lover	Joakim Åhlund, Klas Åhlund, Patrik Arve	
10.	Rock N Roll High School	Joakim Åhlund, Klas Åhlund, Patrik Arve, Thomas Rusiak	

== Charts ==
Chart (2006)	Peak position
Sweden	30
