= Barbie the Album =

2023 soundtrack album by various artists

Barbie: The Album
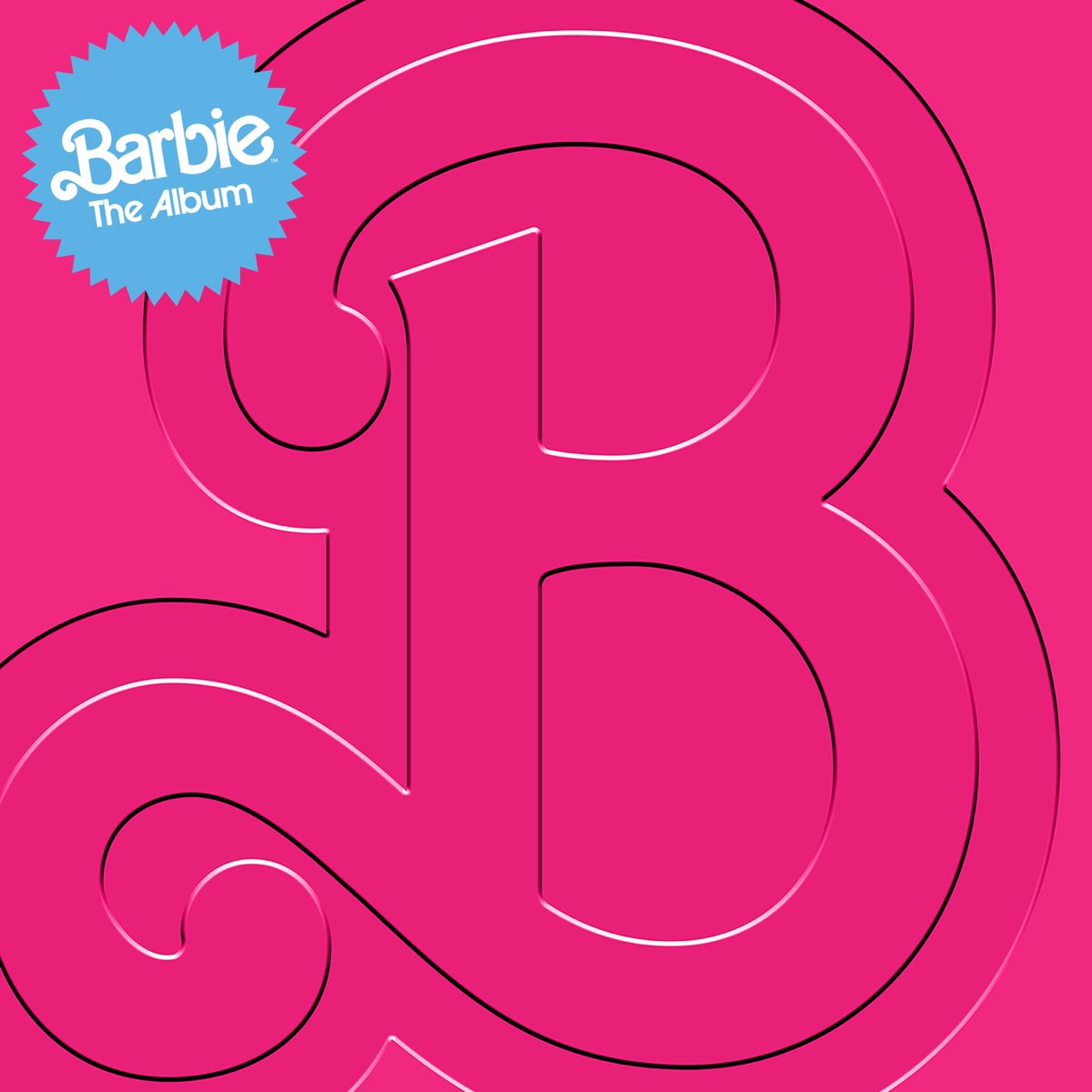
- Digital and sky blue LP artwork

Soundtrack album by various artists
- Released: July 21, 2023
- Studios: Manhattan Center, New York City; Abbey Road, London
- Genres: Pop; bubblegum pop; dance-pop; pop rock; disco; hip-hop
- Length: 44:05
- Label: Atlantic
- Producers: Andrew Wyatt; BloodPop; Chase Worrell; Charlie Puth; Cirkut; Count Baldor; Danielle Haim; Denis Kosiak; Easyfun; Finneas; Jason Kellner; Kevin Parker; Louis Bell; Mark Ronson; Ovy on the Drums; Picard Brothers; PinkPantheress; Reed Berin; Ricky Reed; RiotUSA; Rostam; Space Primates

Alternative cover
- Cover used for the CD and LP versions and the Best Weekend Ever Edition

Singles from Barbie the Album
- 1. "Dance the Night" Released: May 25, 2023; 2. "Angel" Released: June 8, 2023; 3. "Barbie World" Released: June 23, 2023; 4. "Speed Drive" Released: June 29, 2023; 5. "What Was I Made For?" Released: July 13, 2023; 6. "Choose Your Fighter" Released: July 28, 2023

Barbie: The Album is the soundtrack album for the 2023 film Barbie, directed by Greta Gerwig. It was released by Atlantic Records on July 21, 2023, the same day as the film's North American theatrical release. The album was produced by Mark Ronson, Kevin Weaver, and Brandon Davis. It was met with generally favorable reviews from critics.

The album was promoted by the release of six singles; the album's lead single "Dance the Night" by Dua Lipa topped the charts in 10 countries including the UK and Ireland as well as reaching the top ten in 25 countries including the US. The second single was "Angel" by PinkPantheress and the third was "Barbie World", a collaboration by Nicki Minaj and Ice Spice with Aqua, which reached the top ten in 15 territories including the UK and US. A fourth single, "Speed Drive" by Charli XCX, was a top ten hit in the UK and Ireland. The fifth single, "What Was I Made For?" by Billie Eilish, topped the charts in the UK, Ireland, Switzerland, and Australia, and entered the top ten in 15 countries. Ava Max's "Choose Your Fighter" was serviced to airplay radio as the album's sixth single on July 28, 2023.

Upon release, the album was met with critical and commercial success. It debuted at number one in Australia, Canada, the Netherlands and New Zealand and reached the top ten in Austria, Belgium, Czech Republic, France, Germany, Hungary, Spain, Portugal, Switzerland, and the United States. At the 66th Annual Grammy Awards, the album won Best Compilation Soundtrack for Visual Media, while four of its songs ("Dance the Night", "Barbie World", "What Was I Made For?", and "I'm Just Ken") received nominations for Best Song Written for Visual Media. "Dance the Night" and "What Was I Made For?" were additionally nominated for Song of the Year and the latter for Record of the Year. "What Was I Made For?" won both Best Song Written for Visual Media and Song of the Year. At the 96th Academy Awards, two of its songs "What Was I Made For" and "I'm Just Ken" received nominations for Best Original Song, with "What Was I Made For?" winning the Academy Award.

== Background ==
On May 25, 2023, Rolling Stone reported that the Barbie soundtrack would be produced by Mark Ronson and would feature original songs by Ava Max, Charli XCX, Dominic Fike, Fifty Fifty, Gayle, Haim, Ice Spice, Kaliii, Karol G, Khalid, the Kid Laroi, Lizzo, Nicki Minaj, PinkPantheress, Tame Impala, and cast members Dua Lipa and Ryan Gosling, with additional surprise artists being revealed at a later date. That evening, the soundtrack's partial tracklist was released.

On July 6, 2023, Billie Eilish was announced as the soundtrack's first surprise artist. Eilish's inclusion on the album had been speculated after she posted a neon pink Barbie sign on her Instagram account a week prior. On July 10, Sam Smith was announced as the soundtrack's second surprise artist.

== Production ==
Before signing on to the Barbie project, producer Mark Ronson received a text message from his friend, Barbie music supervisor George Drakoulias, that simply stated, "Barbie?" Before Barbie rehearsals could begin in two weeks' time, director Greta Gerwig needed a disco song that would form the basis of highly choreographed dance number. She sent Ronson a playlist of what she had in mind for the soundtrack—"guilty pleasure music" or "Peloton pop"—including songs from Andrea True Connection and Xanadu. Ronson and colleague Andrew Wyatt created a backing track that Gerwig loved and used for the cast's dance rehearsals. This song would later become "Dance the Night" by Dua Lipa.

Over the course of a year, Ronson was tasked with curating a soundtrack that matched Gerwig's vision for Barbie. Gerwig and Ronson made a "wish list" of artists they wanted on the soundtrack, and as the film was being edited in post-production, they would show scenes from the film to these artists. Ronson stated, "Everybody would watch the scene and come back a week or two weeks later, and got exactly to the heart of everything we were trying to do."

In April 2022, Aqua's manager Ulrich Møller-Jørgensen stated that the band's 1997 hit "Barbie Girl" would not be included on the film's soundtrack. However, actress Margot Robbie, who plays Barbie, reportedly begged Gerwig to include the song in the film, and Gerwig assured Robbie that she would find a way to incorporate the song in "a cool way." Nicki Minaj and Ice Spice were then signed to perform a remix of the song for the soundtrack, titled "Barbie World". Aqua are credited as both co-writers and performers on the track.

== Release ==
Barbie the Album was released on July 21, 2023. In addition to several variants of vinyl records and cassette tapes offered on the soundtrack's official website, the album was also released in exclusive colors and designs for Target, Walmart, Barnes & Noble, Amazon, Hot Topic, and Urban Outfitters. Ahead of the soundtrack's release, official listening parties were held at select record stores in the United States, Latin America, Asia, Australia, and Europe on July 18.

=== Singles ===
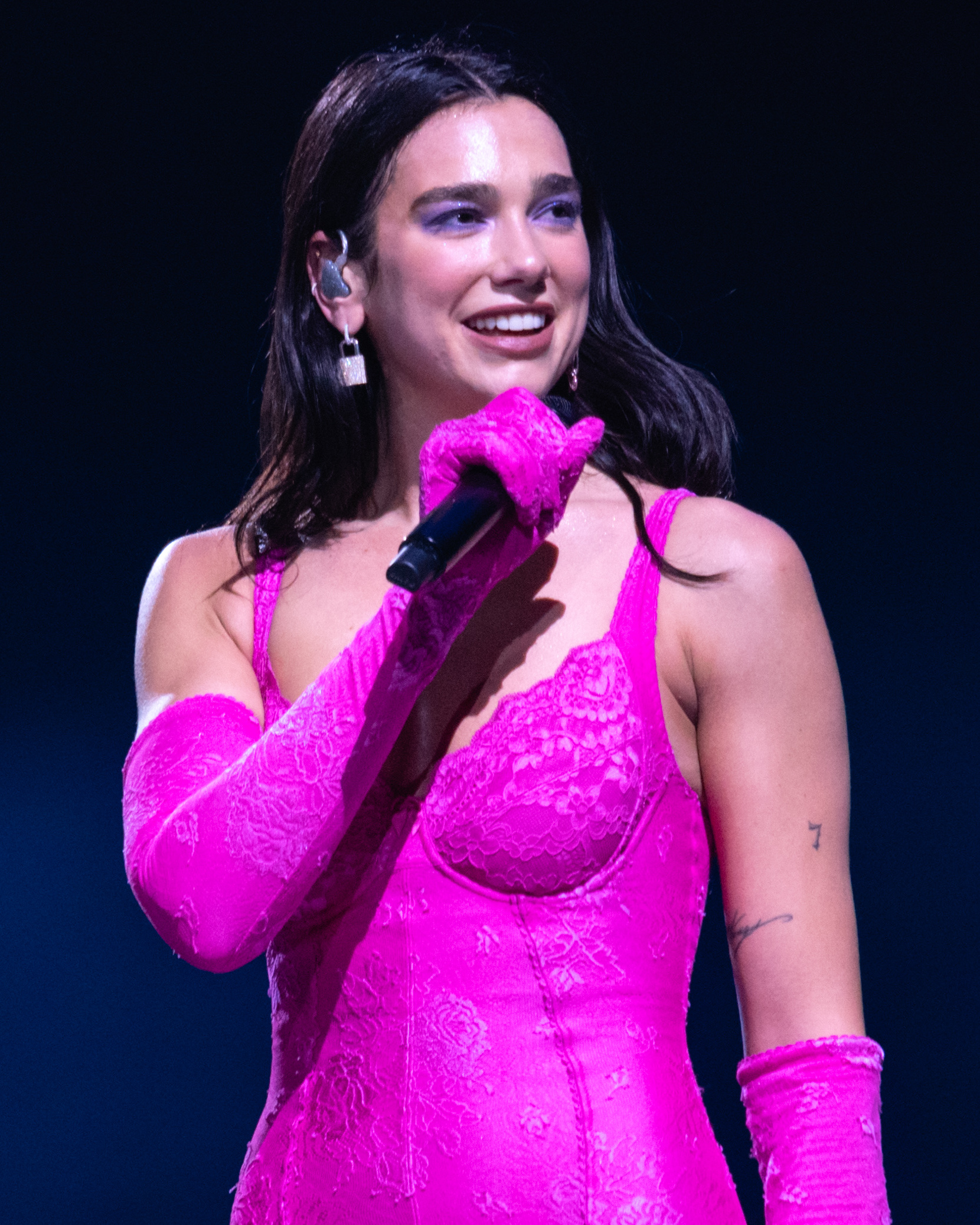
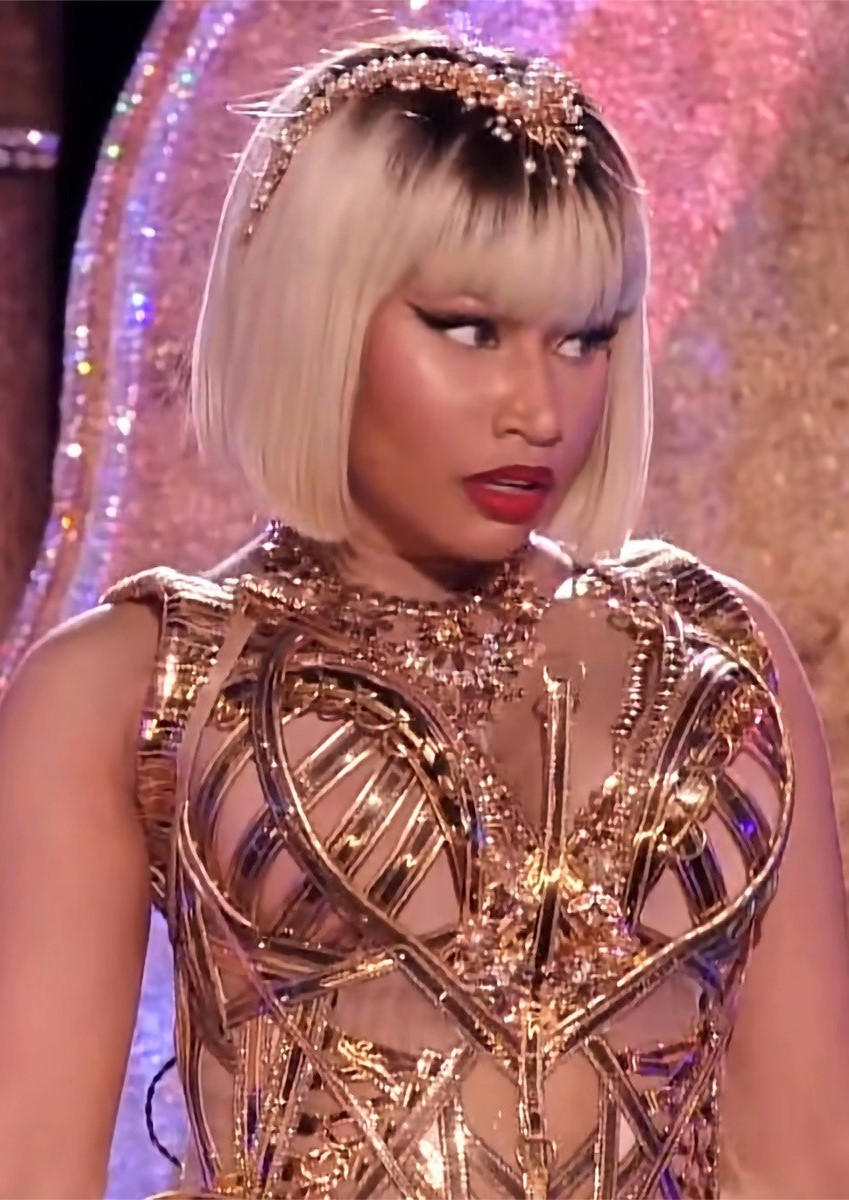
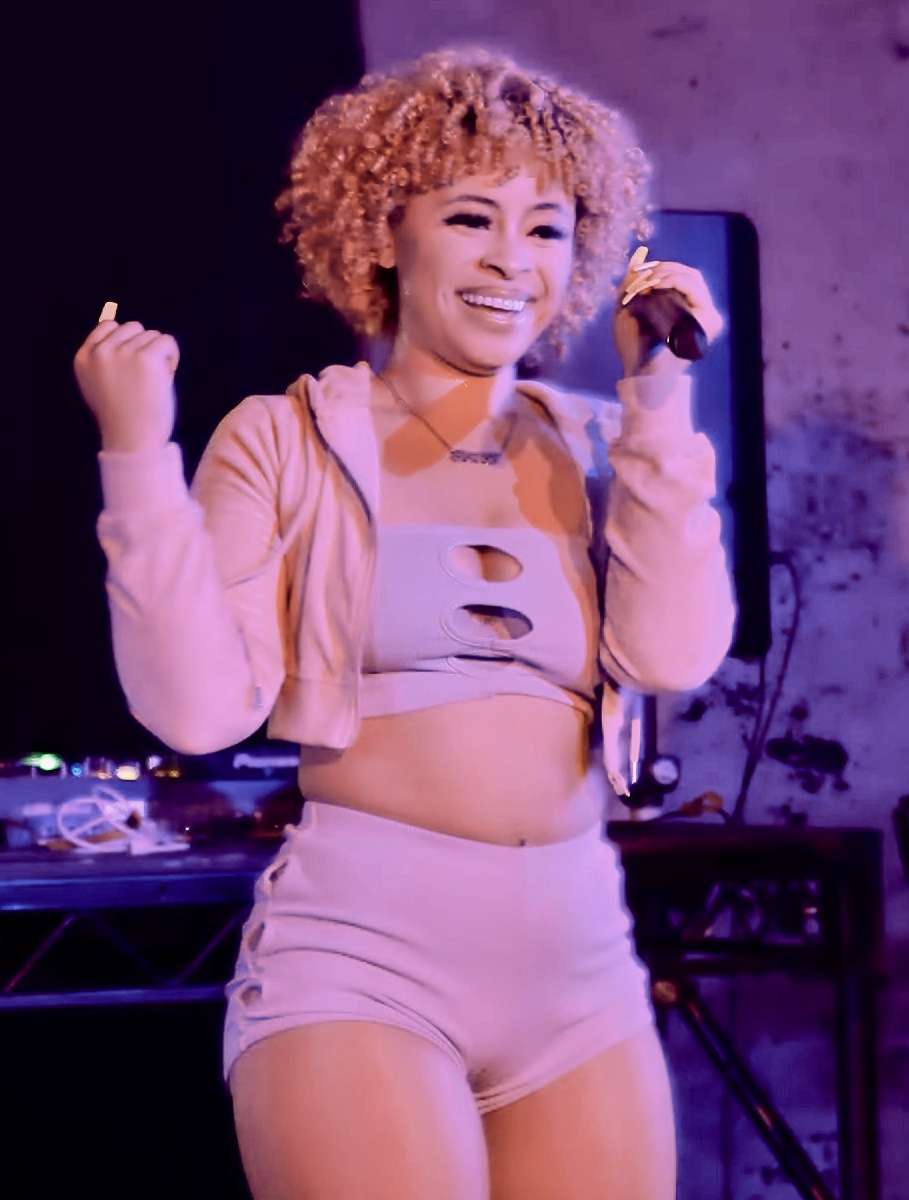
Dua Lipa (left) released the soundtrack's first single "Dance the Night", while Nicki Minaj (middle) and Ice Spice (right) released the third single "Barbie World".
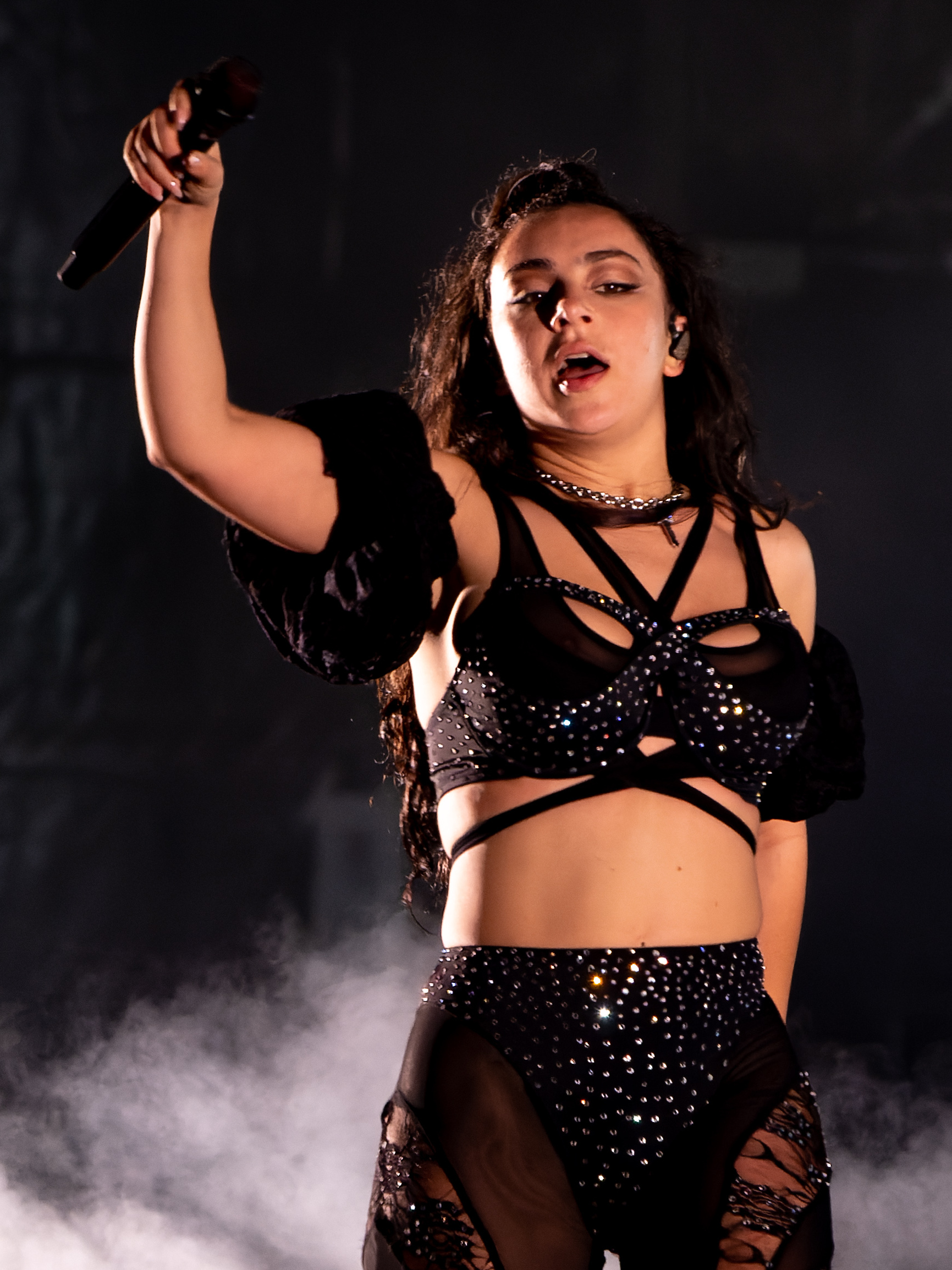
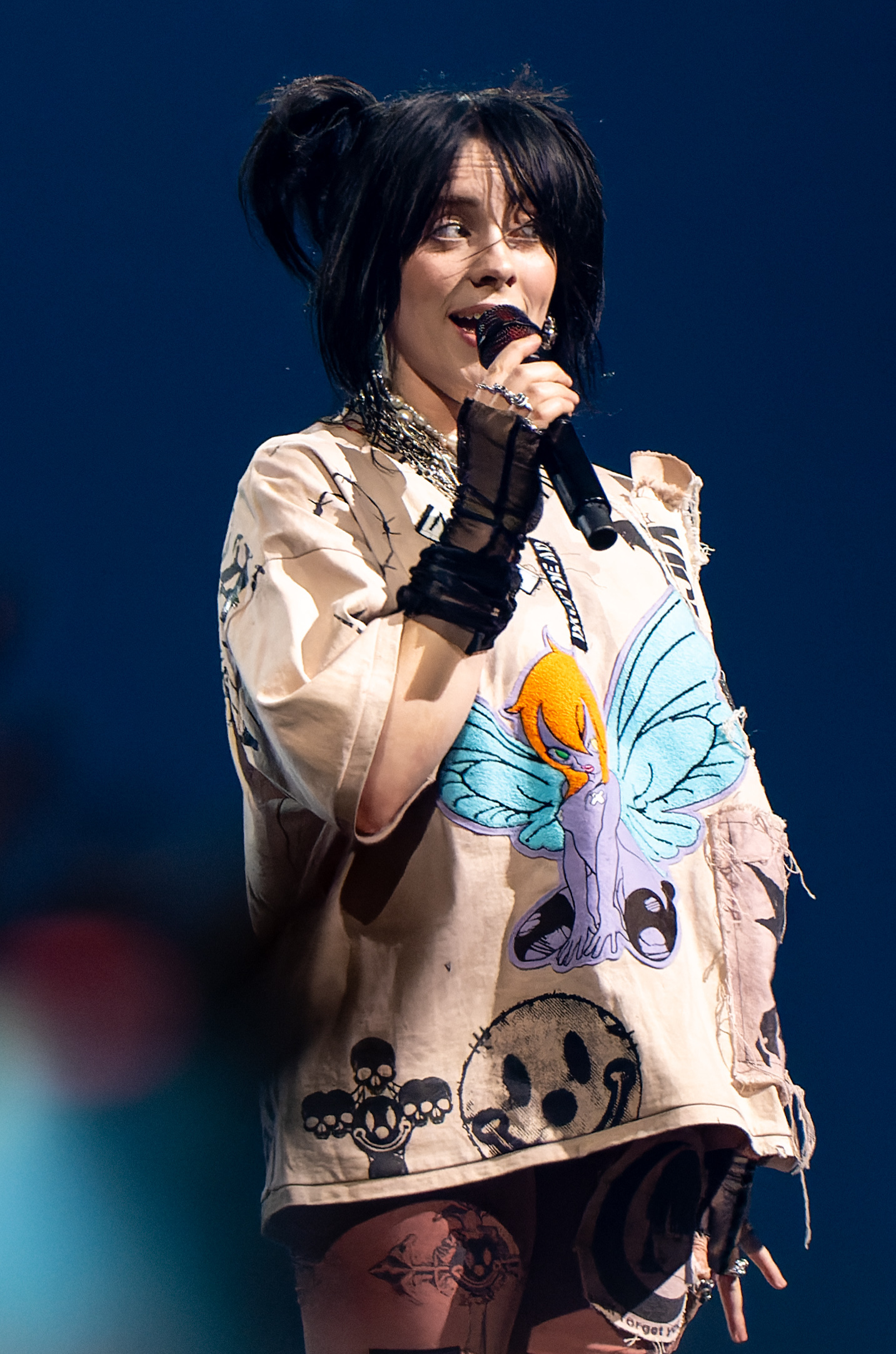
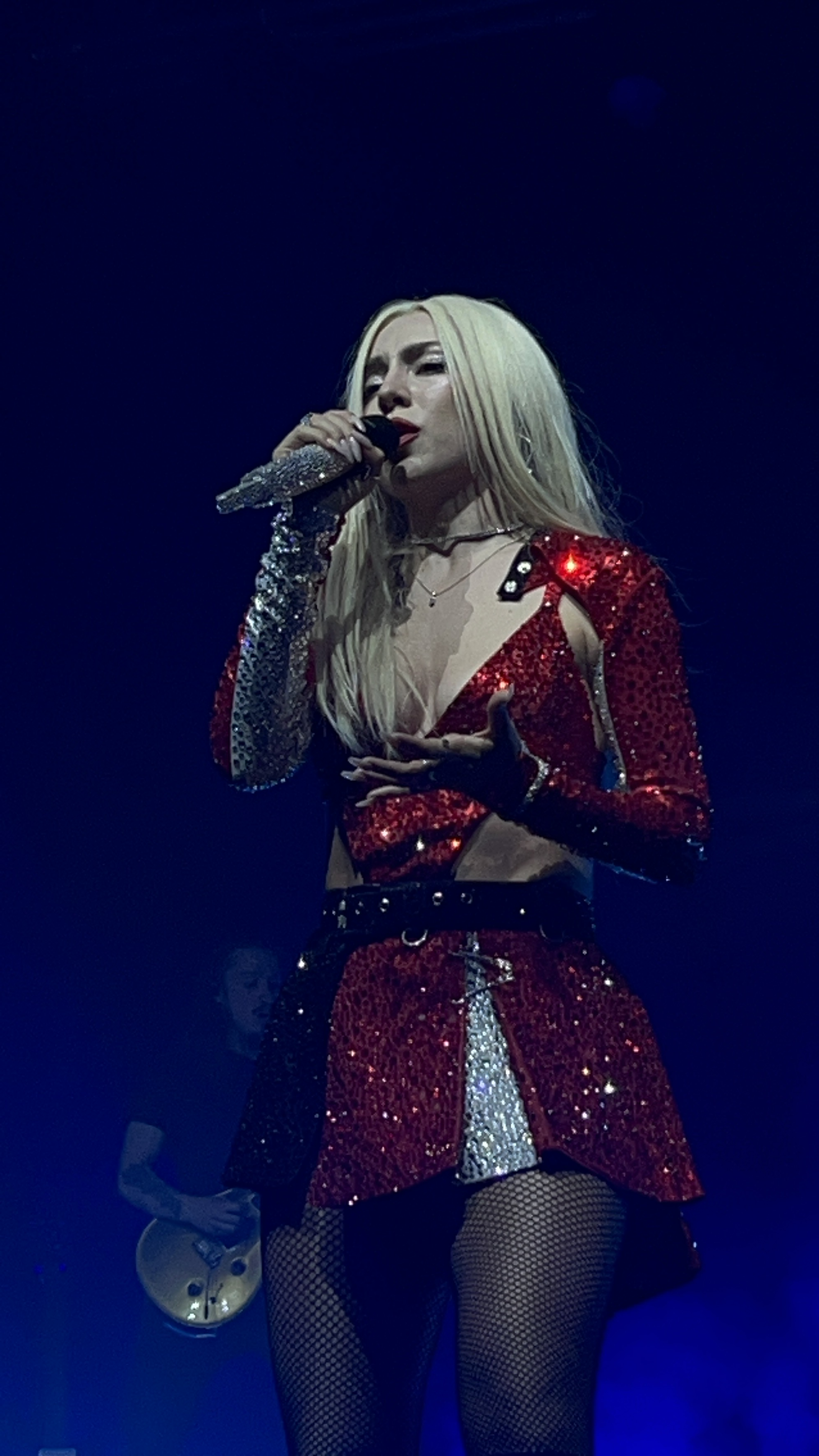
Charli XCX (left), Billie Eilish (middle), and Ava Max (right) released the soundtrack's fourth to sixth singles, "Speed Drive", "What Was I Made For?", and "Choose Your Fighter", respectively.

On May 22, 2023, English-Albanian singer Dua Lipa announced that her single "Dance the Night" would be released at midnight on Friday May 26 BST. The accompanying music video was also released that day and included a cameo by Gerwig. Ronson shared a screenshot of a direct message he sent to Lipa on Instagram in 2022, asking her to co-write and perform a song on the soundtrack for a "huge 60-person dance number", which would later become "Dance the Night". "Dance the Night" peaked at number one on the UK Singles Chart and number six on the US Billboard Hot 100.

The following week on June 2, Colombian singer Karol G released the soundtrack's first promotional single "Watati". Rolling Stone reported that Karol G had visited Ronson's studio to watch scenes from the film on April 15, 2023, the same day she performed on Saturday Night Live. The accompanying music video for the single was released on June 15. "Watati" charted in Spain and various Latin American countries, peaking at number two in Panama and number four in Honduras. The soundtrack's second single, "Angel" by English singer PinkPantheress, was released one week later on June 8, and serviced to Italian radio stations the next day.

On June 10, Trinidadian rapper Nicki Minaj and American rapper Ice Spice announced that their single "Barbie World" would be released on June 23. The soundtrack's third single, it is performed by the two rappers and remixes the 1997 song "Barbie Girl" by Danish band Aqua, who are also credited as performers. The music video, which featured Barbie likenesses of Minaj and Ice Spice, was also released on June 23. "Barbie World" debuted at number seven on the Billboard Hot 100 and peaked at number four on the UK Singles Chart.

English singer Charli XCX released "Speed Drive" on June 29, which was serviced to Italian radio on June 30 as the soundtrack's fourth single. The song peaked at number 9 on the UK Singles Chart. On July 6, South Korean girl group Fifty Fifty released the soundtrack's second promotional single, "Barbie Dreams" featuring American rapper Kaliii.

American singer Billie Eilish was revealed to be the first surprise artist of the soundtrack on July 6. That day, she announced that her song "What Was I Made For?" and its accompanying music video would be released as the soundtrack's fifth single on July 13. Eilish teased the single in a July 12 tweet previewing the music video. "What Was I Made For?" peaked at number 14 on the Billboard Hot 100 and number one on the UK Singles Chart.

The second surprise artist of the soundtrack was revealed to be English singer Sam Smith on July 10. Their song "Man I Am" was released alongside the album as its third promotional single on July 21, peaking at number 58 on the UK Singles Chart.

On July 28, "Choose Your Fighter" by American singer Ava Max was serviced to Italian radio as the sixth single from the soundtrack, and entered the UK Singles Chart at number 90.

=== Best Weekend Ever Edition ===
On the same day as the soundtrack's release, a cover of Indigo Girls' "Closer to Fine" performed by Brandi Carlile and her wife Catherine Carlile and a cover of Matchbox Twenty's "Push" performed by Ryan Gosling were released as part of the deluxe edition of the soundtrack, titled Best Weekend Ever Edition.

== Commercial performance ==
In the United Kingdom, the album debuted at number one on the Official Compilations Chart and had six songs enter the Top 40 on the Official Singles Chart. It also become the first soundtrack album to have three songs on the Top 5 of the Singles Charts simultaneously: "What Was I Made For?" (3), "Dance the Night" (4), and "Barbie World" (5). In the United States, the album debuted at number two on the Billboard 200 in the issue dated August 5, 2023. The album opened with 126,000 album-equivalent units, of which 70,000 were streaming equivalent album, 53,000 were pure album sales, and 3,000 were track equivalent album.

== Critical reception ==
Professional ratings
Aggregate scores
Source	Rating
AnyDecentMusic?	6.1/10
Metacritic	69/100
Review scores
Source	Rating
AllMusic	4/5 stars
The Guardian	2/5 stars
The Independent	3/5 stars
The Line of Best Fit	7/10
NME	3/5 stars
The Observer	4/5 stars
Paste	7.5/10
Pitchfork	5.4/10
Rolling Stone UK	4/5 stars
The Sydney Morning Herald	3/5 stars

Barbie the Album received a score of 69 out of 100 on review aggregator Metacritic based on 13 critics' reviews, indicating "generally favorable" reception. Many critics cited the album's diversity of sound. Jim Pollock of AP News called it an "eclectic sprawl of a soundtrack that can be enjoyed from start to finish." He also noted, "The soundtrack works because the contributors understood the assignment. Collectively, they deliver a dreamhouse of songs that are each at least a little better than they have to be. The tracks succeed both as cinematic elements and as standalone songs. The result is a worthy, danceable bookend to the classic Saturday Night Fever soundtrack of a generation before." On the contrary, some critics felt that the album lacked coherence. Adam White of The Independent called the soundtrack "erratic" and noted that tracks like "Home" by Haim and "What Was I Made For?" by Billie Eilish felt "slightly jarring when surrounded by hot-pink boppery, like a pair of Negative Nancys showing up to spoil your birthday party."

Some critics have emphasized the album as a commercial operation and not an artistic one. Shaad D'Souza of The Guardian found in the project a "union of art and advertising" writing that it "makes it clear that there are charts to beat, goals to reach, and, of course, dolls to sell" believing that "someone like PC Music head and Beyoncé collaborator A. G. Cook might have been able to do for the album what Gerwig has supposedly done for her film, bringing self-referential, existentialist pathos to mainstream art". D'Souza also points out that it is a "pretty good promo for many of the pop A-listers signed to Warner Music Group (Dua Lipa, Lizzo, Charli XCX), as well as some of the C-listers (Gayle, Ava Max)."

Negative reviews also felt that the album contained several weak links. Outside of "a few cute selections" like PinkPantheress's "Angel" and Dua Lipa's "Dance the Night" and "more clever than the rest of Barbie's selections" Charli XCX's "Speed Drive", Cat Zhang of Pitchfork stated that "these throwaway products should largely be left on the shelf". Tomás Mier of Rolling Stone stated that Khalid's "Silver Platter" and The Kid Laroi's "Forever & Again" "felt out of place on the record and [didn't] enhance the LP's Kendom portion." Madeline Roth of The Daily Beast wrote, "It's not as excellent or as fine-tuned as it could have been, thanks to a few busted interlopers, but there's plenty to enjoy as the Summer of Barbie rages on." Alex Rigotti of NME wrote, "The soundtrack has some wonderful highs and some miserable lows – but then again, it's not all rosy in Barbie Land."

Reviewing the film, Courtney Howard of The A.V. Club wrote, "Mark Ronson and Andrew Wyatt's pop soundscape bolsters the synthetic atmosphere in Barbie Land, but they thread the needle perfectly in the Real World, blending musical themes from Billie Eilish's ballad 'What Was I Made For?' to land the palpably moving moments."

In September, Rolling Stone listed the soundtrack as one of the best albums of 2023 so far. It was later included among the 101 Greatest Soundtracks of All Time by Rolling Stone in 2024.

== Accolades ==
Barbie the Album awards and nominations
Award	Year (Note: Indicates the year of ceremony. Each year is linked to the article about the awards held that year, wherever possible.)	Category	Result	Ref.
Hollywood Music in Media Awards	2023	Best Soundtrack Album	Won	
Billboard Music Awards	2023	Top Soundtrack	Won	
St. Louis Film Critics Association Awards	2023	Best Soundtrack	Won	
Grammy Awards	2024	Best Compilation Soundtrack for Visual Media	Won	
Nickelodeon Kids' Choice Awards	2024	Favorite Album	Nominated	

== Track listing ==
Barbie the Album track listing
No.	Title	Writer(s)	Producer(s)	Length
1.	"Pink" (Lizzo)	Andrew Wyatt; Eric Burton Frederic; Mark Ronson; Melissa Jefferson	Wyatt; Ronson; Ricky Reed	2:23
2.	"Dance the Night" (Dua Lipa)	Ronson; Wyatt; Caroline Ailin; Dua Lipa	Wyatt; Ronson; Picard Brothers	2:56
3.	"Barbie World" (Nicki Minaj and Ice Spice with Aqua)	Ephrem Louis Lopez Jr.; Johnny Pedersen; Karsten Dahlgaard; Lene Nystrøm; Isis Gaston; Claus Norreen; Onika Maraj; René Dif; Søren Rasted	RiotUSA	1:49
4.	"Speed Drive" (Charli XCX)	Charlotte Aitchison; David James Parker; Finn Keane; Ewart Everton Brown; Fabian Peter Torsson; Joakim Frans Åhlund; Klas Frans Åhlund; Michael Chapman; Nicholas Chinn; Patrik Knut Arve; Sylvia Robinson; Troy Rami	Easyfun	1:57
5.	"Watati" (Karol G featuring Aldo Ranks)	Aldo Vargas; Carolina Giraldo Navarro; Daniel Echavarría	Ovy on the Drums	2:46
6.	"Man I Am" (Sam Smith)	Frederic; Ronson; Sam Smith	Ronson; Ricky Reed	3:07
7.	"Journey to the Real World" (Tame Impala)	Kevin Parker	Parker	1:27
8.	"I'm Just Ken" (Ryan Gosling)	Wyatt; Ronson	Wyatt; Ronson	3:42
9.	"Hey Blondie" (Dominic Fike)	Dominic Fike; Henry Kwapis; Ronson; Ryan Raymond Raines	Ronson	2:21
10.	"Home" (Haim)	Alana Haim; Danielle Haim; Este Haim; Rostam Batmanglij	D. Haim; Batmanglij	3:46
11.	"What Was I Made For?" (Billie Eilish)	Billie Eilish O'Connell; Finneas O'Connell	Wyatt; Finneas; Ronson	3:42
12.	"Forever & Again" (The Kid Laroi)	Andrew Watt; Billy Walsh; Charlton Howard; Louis Bell	Watt; Bell	2:19
13.	"Silver Platter" (Khalid)	Chase Worrell; Denis Kosiak; Jason Kellner; Khalid Robinson	Worrell; Kosiak; Kellner	2:45
14.	"Angel" (PinkPantheress)	Michael Tucker; Tom Parker; Victoria Beverley Walker	BloodPop; Charlie Puth; Count Baldor; PinkPantheress	2:03
15.	"Butterflies" (Gayle)	Anthony Kiedis; Brett Mazur; Chad Smith; Taylor Rutherfurd; John Frusciante; Michael Balzary; Reed Berin; Seth Binzer	Berin	2:16
16.	"Choose Your Fighter (Note: "Choose Your Fighter" was omitted from the original pressing of the limited edition blue LP, but it was added on the second pressing and is present on all other editions.)" (Ava Max)	Amanda Ava Koci; Madison Love; Michael Pollack	Cirkut	2:17
17.	"Barbie Dreams (Note: "Barbie Dreams" appears on all digital versions of the album; the Ken: The Album edition; the listening party exclusive edition; the Best Weekend Ever Edition CD; the second pressing of the blue LP; the Bonus Track/Character Edition; and the VMP Designer Edition. It does not appear on other CD, vinyl, or cassette editions.)" (Fifty Fifty featuring Kaliii)	Melissa Storwick; James Harris; Janet Jackson; Jonathan Bach; Kaliya Ashley Ross; Marc Sibley; Mike Caren; Nathan Cunningham; Nicholaus Joseph Williams; Randall Hammers; Terry Lewis; Tramaine Winfrey	Space Primates	2:29
Total length:				44:05

Best Weekend Ever Edition bonus tracks
No.	Title	Writer(s)	Producer(s)	Length
18.	"Push" (Ryan Gosling)	Matt Serletic; Robert Thomas	Wyatt; George Drakoulias; Ronson	3:23
19.	"Closer to Fine" (Brandi Carlile and Catherine Carlile)	Emily Saliers	Brandi Carlile	5:52
Total length:				53:31

Bonus Track Edition and Character Editions bonus tracks
No.	Title	Writer(s)	Producer(s)	Length
20.	"Pink (Bad Day)" (Lizzo)	Wyatt; Frederic; Ronson; Jefferson	Wyatt; Ronson; Ricky Reed	1:04
Total length:				54:35

VMP Designer Edition bonus tracks
No.	Title	Writer(s)	Producer(s)	Length
18.	"Pink (Bad Day)" (Lizzo)	Wyatt; Frederic; Ronson; Jefferson	Wyatt; Ronson; Ricky Reed	1:04
Total length:				45:09

Notes

- "Barbie World" contains a sample of "Barbie Girl" (1997), written by Søren Rasted, Claus Norreen, René Dif and Lene Nystrøm, and performed by Aqua.
- "Speed Drive" contains an interpolation of "Mickey" (1981), written by Michael Chapman and Nicholas Chinn, as performed by Toni Basil; and an interpolation of "Cobrastyle" (2006), written by Klas Åhlund, Joakim Åhlund, Patrick Arve, Ewart Brown, Fabian Torsson, Troy Rami, Paul Rota, David Parker and Sylvia Robinson, as performed by Robyn; which itself is a cover of "Cobrastyle" (2004) as performed by Teddybears featuring Mad Cobra.
- "Watati" is misspelled as "Watiti" on the first edition vinyl back covers.
- "Butterflies" contains an interpolation of "Butterfly" (2000), written by Seth Binzer and Bret Mazur, as performed by Crazy Town; which itself is based on a sample of "Pretty Little Ditty" (1989), written by Anthony Kiedis, Chad Smith, John Frusciante and Michael Balzary, as performed by the Red Hot Chili Peppers.
- "Barbie Dreams" contains an interpolation of "Together Again" (1997), written by Janet Jackson, Jimmy Jam, Terry Lewis and René Elizondo Jr., as performed by Jackson.
- "Push" is a cover of the 1996 song by Matchbox Twenty.
- "Closer to Fine" is a cover of the 1989 song by the Indigo Girls.
- "Barbie Dreams" is not included on select versions of the physical album.

== Personnel ==
All credits are adapted from CD liner notes.

- Mark Ronson – soundtrack album producer, bass (1, 8–9), guitar (1–2), synths (1, 8–9), orchestral arrangement (1, 11), Fender Rhodes (track 2), additional production (track 11)
- Kevin Weaver – soundtrack album producer, piano (track 1), synths (track 1), orchestral arrangement (track 1)
- Brandon Davis – soundtrack album producer
- Greta Gerwig – soundtrack album executive producer
- George Drakoulias – soundtrack album executive producer
- Brandon Creed – soundtrack album co-producer
- Joseph Khoury – soundtrack album co-producer
- Randy Merrill – mastering
- Questlove – drums (track 1)
- Aaron Draper – percussion (track 1)
- Andrew Wyatt – piano (track 1), synths (1–2, 8), bass (track 2), background vocals (track 8), choir arrangement (track 8), additional production (track 11), orchestral arrangement (track 11)
- Dave Guy – trumpet (track 1)
- Michael Leonhart – trumpet (track 1)
- Ray Mason – trombone (track 1)
- Ian Hendrickson-Smith – saxophone (track 1)
- MJ Buckley – saxophone (track 1)
- Ricky Reed – drum programming (1, 6), Moog Bass (track 1), piano (track 6), synths (track 6), guitar (track 6)
- Matt Dunkley – orchestral arrangement (1, 8)
- Daniel Escobar – engineering (track 1)
- Ethan Shumaker – engineering (1, 6)
- Jens Jungkurth – engineering (track 1)
- Manny Marroquin – mixing (1, 4, 6, 10, 12)
- Manhattan Center Orchestra – orchestra (1–2, 8)
- Cameron Gower-Poole – vocal production (track 2), engineering (track 2)
- Caroline Ailin – background vocals (track 2)
- Picard Brothers – keyboards (track 2), programming (track 2), additional production (track 8)
- Brandon Bost – programming (2, 8), engineering (2, 8–9)
- Jake Ferguson – assistant engineering (2, 8–9)
- Serban Ghenea – mixing (2–3, 16)
- Bryce Bordone – assistant mix engineering (2–3, 16)
- Aubry "Big Juice" Delaine – additional production (track 3), Nicki Minaj vocal engineer (track 3)
- Rob Kinelski – mixing (5, 11)
- Eli Heisler – assistant mixing (5, 11)
- David Odlum – Sam Smith vocal engineer (track 6)
- Kevin Parker – recording (track 7), mixing (track 7)
- Slash – lead guitar (track 8), rhythm guitar (track 8)
- Wolfgang Van Halen – rhythm guitar (track 8)
- Josh Freese – drums (track 8)
- Mike Richiuti – piano (track 8)
- Roger Manning – synths (track 8)
- Geoff Foster – male choir recording engineer (track 8)
- Peter Cobbin – scoring engineer (track 8), female choir (track 8)
- Kirsty Whalley – scoring engineer (track 8), female choir (track 8)
- Daniel Hayden – Pro Tools recording (track 8)
- Alex Venguer – USA Orchestra recording (track 8), piano recording engineer (track 8)
- Ben Parry – choirmaster (track 8)
- Ricky Damian – engineering (track 8)
- Mike Clink – Slash recording (track 8)
- Tom Elmhirst – mixing (8–9)
- Adam Hong – engineer for mix (8–9)
- Abbey Road Studios Orchestra – orchestra (track 8)
- Ryan Raines – co-production (track 9), drums (track 9), percussion (track 9)
- Henry Kwapis – co-production (track 9), keyboards (track 9), guitar (track 9), programming (track 9)
- Dominic Fike – vocals (track 9), acoustic guitar (track 9)
- John Muller – engineering (track 9)
- Dani Perez – assistant engineering (track 9)
- Este Haim – vocals (track 10), bass (track 10)
- Alana Haim – vocals (track 10), guitar (track 10)
- Rostam Batmanglij – drum programming (track 10), synth bass (track 10), piano (track 10), synths (track 10), 12-string guitar (track 10), string arrangement (track 10), engineering (track 10)
- Gabe Noel – cello (track 10)
- Jake Hallenbeck – synths (track 10)
- Joey Messina-Doerning – engineering (track 10)
- Lauren Marquez – engineering (track 10)
- Nick Noneman – engineering (track 10)
- Billie Eilish – vocal production (track 11), engineering (track 11), vocals (track 11), synths (track 11)
- Finneas – engineering (track 11), piano (track 11), synths (track 11), electric bass (track 11), percussion (track 11), vocal arrangement (track 11)
- Louis Bell – programming (track 12)
- James Keeley – engineering (track 13)
- John Wilkenson Derisme – bass (track 13)
- Denis Kosiak – mixing (track 13)
- Jonny Breakwell – mixing (track 14)
- Andrew Grasso – drums (track 15)
- Chris Condon – drum engineering (track 15), guitar (track 15)
- Pedro Calloni – mixing (track 15)

== Charts ==
=== Weekly charts ===
Weekly chart performance for Barbie the Album
Chart (2023–2024)	Peak position
Australian Albums (ARIA)	1
Austrian Albums (Ö3 Austria)	3
Belgian Albums (Ultratop Flanders)	4
Belgian Albums (Ultratop Wallonia)	3
Canadian Albums (Billboard)	1
Croatian International Albums (HDU)	1
Czech Albums (ČNS IFPI)	2
Danish Albums (Hitlisten)	14
Dutch Albums (Album Top 100)	1
Finnish Albums (Suomen virallinen lista)	17
French Albums (SNEP)	2
German Albums (Offizielle Top 100)	6
Greek Albums (IFPI)	69
Hungarian Albums (MAHASZ)	7
Icelandic Albums (Tónlistinn)	11
Irish Compilation Albums (OCC)	1
Italian Albums (FIMI)	13
Japanese Digital Albums (Oricon)	48
Lithuanian Albums (AGATA)	28
New Zealand Albums (RMNZ)	1
Nigerian Albums (TurnTable Top 50)	45
Norwegian Albums (VG-lista)	12
Polish Albums (ZPAV)	18
Portuguese Albums (AFP)	4
Spanish Albums (Promusicae)	5
Swedish Albums (Sverigetopplistan)	57
Swiss Albums (Schweizer Hitparade)	3
UK Compilation Albums (Official Charts)	1
UK Soundtrack Albums (Official Charts)	1
US Billboard 200	2
US Soundtrack Albums (Billboard)	1

=== Monthly charts ===
Monthly chart performance of Barbie the Album
Chart (2023)	Position
Uruguayan Albums (CUD)	14

=== Year-end charts ===
2023 year-end chart performance for Barbie the Album
Chart (2023)	Position
Australian Albums (ARIA)	37
Belgian Albums (Ultratop Flanders)	95
Belgian Albums (Ultratop Wallonia)	169
Canadian Albums (Billboard)	37
Dutch Albums (Album Top 100)	49
French Albums (SNEP)	61
Hungarian Albums (MAHASZ)	61
New Zealand Albums (RMNZ)	21
US Billboard 200	49
US Soundtrack Albums (Billboard)	1

2024 year-end chart performance for Barbie the Album
Chart (2024)	Position
French Albums (SNEP)	112
US Billboard 200	64
US Soundtrack Albums (Billboard)	1

2025 year-end chart performance for Barbie the Album
Chart (2025)	Position
US Soundtrack Albums (Billboard)	7

== Certifications ==
Certifications for Barbie the Album
Region	Certification	Certified units/sales
Australia (ARIA)	Gold	35,000^{‡}
Canada (Music Canada)	2× Platinum	160,000^{‡}
France (SNEP)	Platinum	100,000^{‡}
Italy (FIMI)	Gold	25,000^{‡}
New Zealand (RMNZ)	2× Platinum	30,000^{‡}
United Kingdom (BPI)	Platinum	300,000^{‡}
^{‡} Sales+streaming figures based on certification alone.

== Release history ==
Release history and formats for Barbie the Album
Region	Date	Format(s)	Edition(s)	Label(s)	Ref.
Various	July 21, 2023	CD; LP; cassette; digital download; streaming	Standard	Atlantic	
Various	July 21, 2023	CD	Ken: The Album	Atlantic	
Various	July 21, 2023	Digital download; streaming	Best Weekend Ever Edition	Atlantic	
Various	August 11, 2023	CD	Best Weekend Ever Edition	Atlantic	
Various	September 22, 2023	LP	Limited edition repress (Note: The repress version of the limited edition sky blue LP feature "Choose Your Fighter" and "Barbie Dreams", which were not featured on the original pressing.)	Atlantic	
Various	October 12, 2023	CD	Bonus Track Edition	Atlantic	
Various	February 9, 2024	LP	Ken: The Album	Atlantic	
Various	March, 2024	LP	VMP Designer Edition	Atlantic	
