= Speed Drive =

2023 single by Charli XCX

Single by Charli XCX

from the album Barbie the Album
- Released: 29 June 2023
- Recorded: 2023
- Genre: Hyperpop
- Length: 1:57
- Label: Atlantic
- Songwriters: Charlotte Aitchison; Finn Keane; David Parker; Ewart Brown; Fabian Torsson; Joakim Åhlund; Klas Åhlund; Michael Chapman; Nicholas Chinn; Patrik Arve; Sylvia Robinson; Troy Rami
- Producer: Easyfun

Charli XCX singles chronology
"Hot Girl" (2022)	"Speed Drive" (2023)	"In the City" (2023)

Music video
- "Speed Drive" on YouTube

"Speed Drive" is a song by British singer Charli XCX from Barbie the Album, the soundtrack of the 2023 film Barbie. The song was released on 29 June 2023 as the fourth single from the soundtrack and reached number nine on the UK Singles Chart, becoming Charli XCX's sixth top 10 single in the chart.

== Background and composition ==
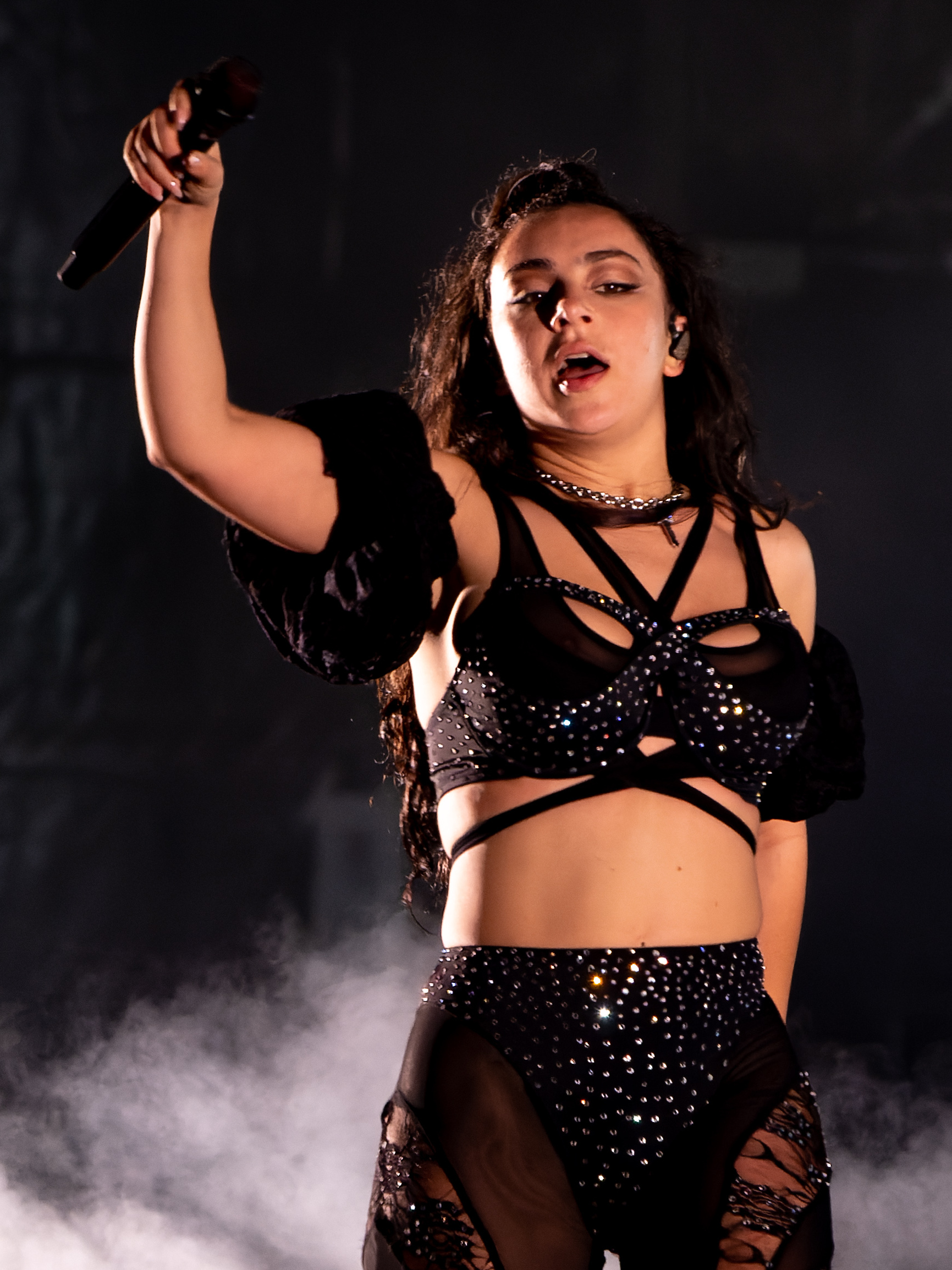
Charli XCX was one of the first artists involved with Barbie the Album.

Charli XCX was one of the first artists that Mark Ronson, the producer of the Barbie soundtrack, contacted to be featured on the album; she, however, felt Ronson asked her "a little late in the game". In an Instagram post on 22 June 2023, Charli XCX shared that she "always loved the escapism" that her Barbie dolls provided and that it was "kind of a full circle moment to be a part of this soundtrack and movie." She revealed in a 2024 Billboard cover story that she had written the song in 30 minutes. Ronson talked about the work with Charli XCX:

"When you’re telling someone where you want their song in the film, everyone wants to hear ‘opening credits’ or ‘closing credits,’ but not ‘car chase. [...] I remember Charli asked: ‘Where are you thinking this song is gonna go?’ And I said, ‘Err, I dunno, car chase?’ under my breath. And Charli just said: ‘This speaks to me in an immense way.’ Because Charli is just so amazing and she just loves that raw energy"

"Speed Drive" contains an interpolation of "Mickey", written by Mike Chapman and Nicholas Chinn, and performed by Toni Basil. It also contains an interpolation of "Cobrastyle", written by Klas Åhlund, Joakim Åhlund, Patrick Arve, Ewart Brown, Fabian Torsson, Troy Rami, Paul Rota, David Parker and Sylvia Robinson, and performed by Robyn; which itself is a cover of "Cobrastyle", performed by Teddybears featuring Mad Cobra. This caused the writing credits to be excessive in length, which Charli XCX said "really sucks" for the writers as they didn't make much money from the publishing.

== Release ==
"Speed Drive" was the third single to be released from the Barbie soundtrack. Ahead of its release, Charli XCX shared a snippet of the song over a clip of Margot Robbie from the Barbie film.

== Reception ==
Alex Gonzalez of Uproxx wrote that "Charli taps into her glimmery, pink energy, giving the Barbie universe the bop of the century." Liberty Dunworth of NME wrote that the single "may be brief—coming in at less than two minutes long—but still manages to pack a punch as one of the most energetic songs on the soundtrack."

Steffanee Wang of Nylon wrote that "Speed Drive" sounded "hyperpop frenzy" and "one of the album's highlights". Cat Zhang of Pitchfork also called the track the "relative highlight" of its parent album and "more clever than the rest of Barbie's selections".

=== Year-end lists ===
Select year-end rankings of "Speed Drive"
Publication	List	Rank	Ref.
The Guardian	The 20 Best Songs of 2023	12	
Pitchfork	The 100 Best Songs of 2023	56	

== Music video ==
On 1 August 2023, Charli XCX filmed an official music video for the song, which was released on 16 August 2023. The music video for "Speed Drive", directed by Ramez Silyan, premiered via Charli XCX's YouTube channel. The video featured cameos from Sam Smith and Devon Lee Carlson.

== Commercial performance ==
In the United Kingdom, "Speed Drive" reached number nine on the Official Singles Chart, becoming Charli XCX's sixth top 10 single and her first as a lead artist since "Doing It" with Rita Ora in 2015. In the United States, the song became the singer's first entry on the Billboard Hot 100 since "Break the Rules" in 2014, her fifth song to chart overall.

The commercial success of "Speed Drive", which Charli XCX dubbed "random", inspired her to write her 2024 track "Rewind".

== Personnel ==
All credits are adapted from CD liner notes of Barbie the Album.

- Charlotte Aitchison – songwriter
- Easyfun – songwriter, producer
- Joakim Frans Åhlund – songwriter
- Klas Frans Åhlund – songwriter
- Patrik Knut Arve – songwriter
- Ewart Everton Brown – songwriter
- David James Parker – songwriter
- Troy Rami – songwriter
- Sylvia Robinson – songwriter
- Fabian Peter Torsson – songwriter
- Mike Chapman – songwriter
- Nicholas Chinn – songwriter
- Manny Marroquin – mixing

== Charts ==
Chart performance for "Speed Drive"
Chart (2023)	Peak position
Australia (ARIA)	22
Austria (Ö3 Austria Top 40)	47
Canada Hot 100 (Billboard)	44
Canada CHR/Top 40 (Billboard)	48
Czech Republic Singles Digital (ČNS IFPI)	37
Germany (GfK)	82
Global 200 (Billboard)	58
Guatemala Anglo (Monitor Latino)	17
Ireland (IRMA)	7
Latvia (EHR)	30
Netherlands (Single Tip)	9
New Zealand (Recorded Music NZ)	22
Poland (Polish Streaming Top 100)	39
Slovakia Singles Digital (ČNS IFPI)	61
Sweden Heatseeker (Sverigetopplistan)	9
Switzerland (Schweizer Hitparade)	89
UK Singles (Official Charts)	9
US Billboard Hot 100	73
US Pop Airplay (Billboard)	22

== Certifications ==
Certifications for "Speed Drive"
Region	Certification	Certified units/sales
Canada (Music Canada)	Gold	40,000^{‡}
New Zealand (RMNZ)	Gold	15,000^{‡}
Poland (ZPAV)	Gold	25,000^{‡}
United Kingdom (BPI)	Gold	400,000^{‡}
^{‡} Sales+streaming figures based on certification alone.

== Release history ==
Release dates and formats for "Speed Drive"
Region	Date	Format(s)	Label(s)	Ref.
Various	29 June 2023	Digital download; streaming	Atlantic	
Italy	30 June 2023	Radio airplay	Warner	
