= Angel (PinkPantheress song) =

2023 single by PinkPantheress

Single by PinkPantheress

from the album Barbie the Album
- Released: 8 June 2023
- Genre: Bubblegum pop; dance-pop
- Length: 2:03
- Label: Parlophone; Atlantic
- Songwriters: Victoria Walker; Michael Tucker; Thomas Parker
- Producers: BloodPop; Count Baldor; PinkPantheress

PinkPantheress singles chronology
"Way Back" (2023)	"Angel" (2023)	"Turn Your Phone Off" (2023)

"Angel" is a song by British singer-songwriter PinkPantheress for Barbie the Album, the soundtrack of the 2023 film Barbie. It was released on 8 June 2023 as the second single from the album. Written and produced by PinkPantheress, Count Baldor, and BloodPop, it is a bubblegum pop song about a lover named Johnny who ghosts PinkPantheress. It features Auto-Tuned vocals by PinkPantheress over breakbeat percussion and country-inspired guitar; it also includes an Irish jig-inspired fiddle break. The song was positively received by critics, who were favourable of PinkPantheress's vocal delivery and its similarities to PC Music, with some deeming it a highlight from the album. It peaked at number 76 on the Irish Singles Chart.

== Background and composition ==
PinkPantheress received a call from Mark Ronson, one of the executive producers for the Barbie soundtrack album, who started "naming [her] deep cut songs" before asking her to make a song for the soundtrack. "Angel" was produced by PinkPantheress, BloodPop, and Count Baldor. It was teased by PinkPantheress on her TikTok account with a video featuring a snippet of the song and a tweet revealing its release date. "Angel" was released on 9 June 2023 as a promotional single and third single overall from the Barbie soundtrack, following Dua Lipa's "Dance the Night" and Karol G and Aldo Ranks's "Watati".

"Angel" is a bubblegum pop and dance-pop song with "maximalist" production consisting of an Irish jig-inspired fiddle break, "snappy" breakbeat percussion, country-inspired guitar, and PinkPantheress's "soft-sung", Auto-Tuned vocals. The song's lyrics are about PinkPantheress getting ghosted by a lover named Johnny. In the song's chorus, she sings, "Cause one day / One day my baby just ran away / My angel / You’re what haunts me now that you're away". Erica Gonzales of Elle wrote that "Angel" felt "atmospheric and cinematic". For Consequence, Carys Anderson wrote that the lyrics, including "Everyone tells me that life is hard, but it's a piece of cake", sounded like they were sung "from the perspective of Barbie herself".

== Reception ==
Larisha Paul of Rolling Stone wrote, "The record sounds like the perfect soundtrack to the Barbie dress-up games of the early 2000s that died when Adobe Flash Player did." For Clash, Robin Murray wrote that "Angel" had "a pleasing sense of innocence" and was "subtle but striking, easing PinkPantheress out into fresh climes", also comparing the song's sound to "PC Music's more heart-on-sleeve moments". Lindsay Zoladz of The New York Times praised the "dreamy melody" and PinkPantheress's "vocal delivery that blends wide-eyed optimism with creeping doubt" on "Angel" and described the song as "aching" and "bittersweet". Vicky Jessop of the Evening Standard called the song a "banger" and "slightly different from PinkPantheress's usual fare". Starr Bowenbank of Billboard wrote that "Angel" was a "treat" for "diehard PinkPantheress fans", calling PinkPantheress's vocals "effervescent" and writing that "the instrumentation adds another unique layer to the British artist's sound with the inclusion of the fiddle".

For The Guardian, Shaad D'Souza praised "Angel" as a highlight on Barbie the Album and as "one of the few [songs on the album] to not sound totally denuded of emotion or flair" due to Count Baldor's PC Music-adjacent production. Beats Per Minute's Lucas Martins also called it "the album's final highlight", which was "surprisingly good, surprisingly natural, and thanks to [PinkPantheress]'s perfectly suited performance, surprisingly Barbie". Adam White complimented the song as "a lovely bit of PC Music airiness that calls to mind the late Sophie at her most romantic" and wrote that its fiddle break was "breathtaking", citing it as an example of Barbie the Album being "at its best when it embraces the purely weird". Cat Zhang of Pitchfork identified "Angel" as one of "a few cute selections" on Barbie the Album along with "Dance the Night", describing it as "a 2000s rom-com track". For The Sydney Morning Herald, Robert Moran called it one of several "fun, if inessential, inclusions" on the album. Tanatat Khuttapan, for The Line of Best Fit, criticized the existence of "Angel" on the Barbie soundtrack as "almost pointless" due to its failure to "interact with [its] respective scene" in the film.

== Live performances ==
PinkPantheress gave her first live performance of "Angel" during her November 2023 set at Camp Flog Gnaw Carnival at Dodger Stadium. During the song's fiddle break, a man appeared on stage and performed an Irish stepdance routine, after which PinkPantheress remarked, "It wasn't planned. I don't know who he is. He ate that, though."

== Personnel ==
All credits are adapted from CD liner notes of Barbie the Album.

- PinkPantheress – vocals, songwriter, producer
- Count Baldor – songwriter, producer
- BloodPop – songwriter, producer
- Jonny Breakwell – mixing

== Charts ==
Chart performance for "Angel"
Chart (2023)	Peak position
Ireland (IRMA)	76
Japan Hot Overseas (Billboard Japan)	10
New Zealand Hot Singles (RMNZ)	19
