= Hiphopper =

Hiphopper may refer to:

- Hip hop
- Hiphopper, a cover of the song Punkrocker
