= Flex (Mad Cobra song) =

1992 single by Mad Cobra

Single by Mad Cobra

from the album Hard to Wet, Easy to Dry
- B-side: "Yes or No"
- Released: 30 July 1992
- Genre: R&B
- Length: 3:55
- Label: Columbia
- Songwriters: Ewart Brown; Brian Thompson
- Producers: Clifton Dillon; Sly Dunbar

Mad Cobra singles chronology
| "Love Fever" (1991) | "Flex" (1992) | "Dead End Street" (1993) |

Music video
- "Flex" on YouTube

"Flex" is a song co-written and performed by Jamaican dancehall recording artist Mad Cobra, issued in July 1992 by Columbia Records, as the first single from his sixth studio album, Hard to Wet, Easy to Dry (1992). It is his only song to appear on the US Billboard Hot 100 and Cash Box Top 100 charts, peaking at number 13 on both charts in January 1993. It also peaked at number one on the Billboard Hot Rap Singles chart and on Canada's The Record Retail Singles chart. The accompanying music video was directed by American director Scott Hamilton Kennedy.

== Composition ==
Mad Cobra stated that he was on a flight returning from New York, and was watching an exercise video on the in-flight entertainment system, and the lyrics "How this lady flex like she want to have sex?" came to him. He wrote the lyrics for the song on an air sickness bag in his plane seat and took them to the studio when he arrived in Jamaica. The song was meant to be an uptempo dancehall track in Mad Cobra's usual style, but became a slower R&B song when the backing tape accidentally slowed down and Mad Cobra slowed down his vocals to match the tape speed.

== Charts ==
=== Weekly charts ===
Weekly chart performance for "Flex"
| Chart (1992–1993) | Peak position |
|---|---|
| Canada Retail Singles (The Record) | 1 |
| US Billboard Hot 100 | 13 |
| US Hot R&B Singles (Billboard) | 7 |
| US Hot Rap Singles (Billboard) | 1 |
| US Maxi-Singles Sales (Billboard) | 12 |
| US Top 40/Rhythm-Crossover (Billboard) | 27 |
| US Cash Box Top 100 | 13 |

=== Year-end charts ===
Year-end chart performance for "Flex"
| Chart (1993) | Position |
|---|---|
| US Hot R&B Singles (Billboard) | 80 |

=== Decade-end charts ===
Decade-end chart performance for "Flex"
| Chart (1990–1999) | Position |
|---|---|
| Canada (Nielsen SoundScan) | 63 |
