= Dansbandsnatt =

Studio album by Torgny Melins
- Released: 27 January 2010
- Genre: dansband music
- Length: circa 38 minutes
- Label: Sony BMG Music Entertainment
- Producer: Anders Larsson

Torgny Melins chronology
| Allting som vi har (2007) | Dansbandsnatt (2010) |

Dansbandsnatt is a studio album released on 27 January 2010 by Swedish dansband Torgny Melins.

== Track listing ==
| # | Title | Writer | Length |
|---|---|---|---|
| 1. | Boten Anna | Jonas Altberg | |
| 2. | Dansbandsnatt | Anders Larsson, Daniel Lindroth | |
| 3. | Gummiboll ("Rubber Ball") (wiet with Lill-Babs) | Arne Orlowski, Aaron Schroeder, Stikkan Anderson | |
| 4. | 800 grader | Joakim Thåström, Lennart Eriksson, Gunnar Ljungstedt | |
| 5. | Fem minuter i himmelen (duet with Melissa Williams) | Thomas "Orup" Eriksson, Lena Philipsson | |
| 6. | Om och om igen | Benny Andersson, Björn Ulvaeus | |
| 7. | Vad var det jag sa | Hans Bäckström, Kent Liljefjäll | |
| 8. | Poison | Desmond Child, Alice Cooper, John McCurry | |
| 9. | Sommaren är din, Maria | Björn Johansson, Peter Klaman | |
| 10. | Viva la vida | Guy Berryman, John Buckland, Will Champion, Chris Martin | |
| 11. | Ge mig ett svar när jag ringer | Thomas Deutgen, Lars Blomkvist | |
| 12. | En ny romans | Gustav Mårtensson, Viktor Skoog | |
| 13. | Bortom allt | Thomas G:son | |
| 14. | Snart är det lördag igen | Torgny Melins | |
| 15. | Kom igen Lena | Håkan Hellström | |

== Charts ==
=== Weekly charts ===
| Chart (2010) | Peak position |
|---|---|
| Swedish Albums (Sverigetopplistan) | 2 |

=== Year-end charts ===
| Chart (2010) | Position |
|---|---|
| Swedish Albums (Sverigetopplistan) | 76 |
