= I Can't Believe It's Teddybears STHLM =

Studio album by Teddybears STHLM
- Released: 1996
- Genre: Alternative rock; trip hop; hardcore punk; post-hardcore; noise rock
- Length: 42:03
- Label: MVG Records
- Producer: Christian Falk & Teddybears STHLM

Teddybears STHLM chronology
Step on It EP (1994)	I Can't Believe It's Teddybears STHLM (1996)	Rock 'n' Roll Highschool (2000)

I Can't Believe It's Teddybears STHLM is the second studio album by Teddybears STHLM. It was released in 1996 by MVG.

== Track listing ==
All songs by Teddybears STHLM & lyrics by Patrik Arve, unless otherwise noted.

1. "Magic Finger" - 3:33
2. "Two Time Nation" - 3:33
3. "Fish Out of Water" - 2:57
4. "Irresistible Itch" - 2:38
5. "Kanzi" - 3:49
6. "Rude Criminal" - 2:46
7. "The Robots" - 3:02 (music & lyrics: Ralf Hütter, Florian Schneider & Karl Bartos)
8. "Jim" - 5:04
9. "Adapted" - 1:54
10. "Fellowship Blinkers" - 2:32
11. "Stumbles & Falls" - 4:06
12. "Me, Mum & Daddy" - 2:25
13. (untitled hidden track)
14. "Boris" - 3:44

== Musicians ==
- Big Sweet Poppa Pat - vocals & human beatbox
- Jocko Apa - bass & vocals
- Klan Åhlund - guitar
- Erik Olsson - drums
- Christian Falcon Falk - drums
- Sleepy - scratches
- Per Lindvall - percussion
