= Man I Am =

2023 song by Sam Smith

Promotional single by Sam Smith

from the album Barbie the Album
- Released: 21 July 2023
- Genre: Synth-pop; disco
- Length: 3:07
- Label: Capitol; Atlantic
- Songwriters: Samuel Smith; Mark Ronson; Eric Frederic
- Producers: Mark Ronson; Ricky Reed

"Man I Am" is a song by English singer Sam Smith for Barbie the Album, the soundtrack of the 2023 film Barbie. It was released on 21 July 2023, as the album's third promotional single.

== Background ==
On 25 May 2023, Rolling Stone announced a partial tracklist of the Barbie soundtrack, with two additional tracks and surprise artists to be revealed at a later date. On 10 July, Smith was revealed as the second surprise artist of the soundtrack, with their song "Man I Am" being released on 21 July.

On 12 July, Smith teased the song on Twitter with a clip from the film.

== Production ==
Smith was invited by Barbie director Greta Gerwig and soundtrack producer Mark Ronson to write a song from Ken's perspective. Ronson described the track as "the missing piece of Ken's puzzle" and "put[ting] the sound of Ken's liberation perfectly into song".

== Personnel ==
All credits are adapted from CD liner notes of Barbie the Album.

- Sam Smith – songwriter
- Mark Ronson – songwriter, producer
- Eric Frederic – songwriter, producer, piano, synthesizers, guitar, drum programming
- Ethan Shumaker – engineering
- David Odlum – Sam Smith vocal engineering
- Manny Marroquin – mixing

== Charts ==
Chart performance for "Man I Am"
| Chart (2023) | Peak position |
|---|---|
| Ireland (IRMA) | 68 |
| Nicaragua Anglo (Monitor Latino) | 6 |
| Panama Anglo (Monitor Latino) | 11 |
| San Marino (SMRRTV Top 50) | 46 |
| UK Singles (OCC) | 58 |
