= Torgny Melins =

- Origin: Säffle, Sweden
- Genres: dansband music
- Years active: 1983-present

Torgny Melins is a dansband from Säffle, Sweden, scoring chart successes in Sweden by the mid-late 2000s. In 2006, the band played at the Hultsfred Festival, becoming first dansband since Sven-Ingvars in 1991 to do so. The band has also played at the Arvika Festival. The band has also recorded Teddybears Stockholm songs on the 2006 album Dansbander, as well as recorded soundtrack music for the 2007 "Snart är det lördag igen" film.

In May 2007, TV4 aired a documentary series about the band, Torgny Melins - från Säffle till Stureplan. In 2007, the band also recorded a duet with Kikki Danielsson, "Ska du gå din väg", on the album Allting som vi har.

The band also participated at Dansbandskampen 2009, being one of the finalists.

In March 2011, the band announced they would take a break.

== Discography ==
=== Albums ===
- Torgny Melins - 1996
- Torgny Melins 15 år - 1999
- Dansbander - 2006
- Allting som vi har - 2007
- Dansbandsnatt - 2010

==== Singles ====
- Bortom allt - 2008
