= Magic Villa =

Studio album by Thomas Rusiak
- Released: 1 April 2000 (Sweden); 4 December 2000 (UK and United States)
- Genre: Hip hop
- Length: 58:00
- Label: LED Recordings
- Producer: Thomas Rusiak, Kent (Gillström) Isaacs

Thomas Rusiak chronology
Magic Villa (2000)	In the Sun (2003)

Magic Villa is the debut solo album by Swedish hip hop artist Thomas Rusiak. The album peaked at #9 on the Swedish album chart on 10 August 2000

== Track listing ==
All songs written and produced by Thomas Rusiak, except where noted.

1. "Featherweight" – 6:05
2. "Whole Lot of Things" – 3:41
3. "All Yours" – 3:52
  - Featuring Awa
4. "She" – 5:33
  - Featuring Masayah
5. "Fire Walk With Me" – 3:43
  - Featuring Pee Wee
6. "Hiphopper" – 4:48
  - Featuring Teddybears STHLM
7. "Existence" – 5:34
  - Featuring Titiyo
8. "Pearls" – 4:20
9. "STHLM's Finest" – 2:29
  - Featuring Teddybears STHLM
10. "Ahead of My Time" – 3:11
11. "Breakout" – 8:23
12. "Magic Villa" – 6:13
