= In the City (Charli XCX and Sam Smith song) =

Single by Charli XCX and Sam Smith
- Released: 19 October 2023
- Genre: Dance-pop
- Length: 2:56
- Label: Atlantic
- Songwriters: Alexander Cook; Charli XCX; George Daniel; Ilya Salmanzadeh; Sam Smith; Omer Fedi
- Producers: George Daniel; A. G. Cook; Charli XCX; Ilya; Omer Fedi

Charli XCX singles chronology
"Speed Drive" (2023)	"In the City" (2023)	"Von Dutch" (2024)

Sam Smith singles chronology
"Desire" (2023)	"In the City" (2023)	"Love Is a Stillness" (2025)

Audio video
- "In the City" on YouTube

"In the City" is a song by the British singers Charli XCX and Sam Smith. It was released on 19 October 2023 through Atlantic Records.

== Background ==
History between the two artists dates back as far as 2014, when both would hang out together at the 2014 MTV Video Music Awards as well as a subsequent cover of "Stay with Me" by Charli XCX. Nine years later, in the music video for her single "Speed Drive", Charli XCX hinted at an upcoming collaboration through a phone call with Smith in which they ask whether she heard the "new mix" and prompt her to "submit" it.

On 7 October, Charli XCX shared a snippet of a track she had been working on in the studio, described as "upbeat dance-pop". The news came shortly after she confirmed to be working on the successor of Crash (2022). Smith confirmed the collaboration on 11 October through a post on Instagram where they are seen strutting down an alleyway in Osaka, Japan, to another snippet of the track. Charli XCX announced the track on her social media on 13 October.

== Description ==
The roughly 3-minute dance track is in the tech house genre. It starts with a thumping beat before Charli XCX starts solo-singing. On the third beat-shift, the vocals drop off and Smith starts their solo part 80 seconds into the track, lasting less than 15 seconds before the two start singing together.

They claim to have found something they never thought they would find "in the city, in the dark", a phrase which is repeated throughout the chorus of the song. The narrative of the duet weaves between the two performers: Charli XCX in her verse sings about becoming like water as she dances beneath the lights; Smith in their verse sings how they feel about the other person when they met them in New York City.

== Track listing ==
- Digital download / streaming single
1. "In the City" – 2:56
- Digital download / streaming single – remix
1. "In the City" (DJ HEARTSTRING remix) – 3:33

== Charts ==
Weekly chart performance for "In the City"
Chart (2023–2024)	Peak position
CIS Airplay (TopHit)	198
Croatia (HRT)	36
Ireland (IRMA)	47
Japan Hot Overseas (Billboard Japan)	10
Latvia Airplay (LAIPA)	16
Netherlands (Tipparade)	24
New Zealand Hot Singles (RMNZ)	8
San Marino (SMRRTV Top 50)	47
Slovakia Airplay (ČNS IFPI)	53
South Korea BGM (Circle)	115
South Korea Download (Circle)	182
Sweden (Sverigetopplistan)	49
UK Singles (Official Charts)	41
UK Dance (Official Charts)	24
US Hot Dance/Electronic Songs (Billboard)	6

== Release history ==
Release dates and formats for "In the City"
Region	Date	Format	Version	Label	Ref.
Various	19 October 2023	Digital download; streaming	Original	Atlantic	
Italy	20 October 2023	Radio airplay	Original	Warner	
Various	1 December 2023	Digital download; streaming	DJ HEARTSTRING remix	Atlantic	
