= Devil's Music =

2010 studio album by Teddybears

Studio album by Teddybears
- Released: 24 March 2010
- Genre: Electropop, alternative dance
- Length: 38:50
- Label: Sony Music

Teddybears chronology
| Soft Machine (2006) | Devil's Music (2010) |

Professional ratings
Review scores
| Source | Rating |
|---|---|
| Allmusic | 3/5 stars |
| The A.V. Club | C+ |
| MSN Music (Expert Witness) | A |
| Rolling Stone | 2.5/5 stars |
| Spin | (6/10) |
| Tiny Mix Tapes | 3.5/5 stars |

Devil's Music is the sixth studio album by Swedish band Teddybears, released on 24 March 2010 on Sony Music. It was released in the United States on 21 June 2011 with a slightly altered track listing, Robyn replacing Maipei as the featured artist on "Cardiac Arrest", and B.o.B replacing Desmond Forster on "Get Mama a House".

== Track listing ==
1. "Rocket Scientist" (feat. Eve) - 3:07
2. "Get Mama a House" (feat. Desmond Foster) - 3:22
3. "Cardiac Arrest" (feat. Mapei) - 3:00
4. "Glow in the Dark" - 3:33
5. "Get Fresh with You" (feat. Laza Morgan) - 3:14
6. "Cho Cha" (feat. Cee-Lo Green & The B-52s) - 3:21
7. "Crystal Meth Christian" (feat. The Flaming Lips) - 3:44
8. "Cisum Slived" - 4:19
9. "Devil's Music" (feat. ADL) - 3:26
10. "Tek It Down" (feat. Rigo) - 3:05
11. "Wolfman" - 4:17
12. "Bukowski" - 0:22

== Charts ==
| Chart (2010–2011) | Peak position |
|---|---|
| Swedish Albums Chart | 10 |
| US Top Heatseekers Albums | 40 |
