= Allting som vi har =

Studio album by Torgny Melins
- Released: 30 May 2007
- Genre: dansband music
- Length: circa 38 minutes
- Label: Sony BMG Music Entertainment
- Producer: Anders Larsson

Torgny Melins chronology
Dansbander (2006)	Allting som vi har (2007)	Dansbandsnatt (2010)

Allting som vi har is a 2007 Torgny Melins studio album.

== Track listing ==
#	Title	Writer	Length
1.	Kom igen Lena	Håkan Hellström	
2.	Snart är det lördag igen	Torgny Melin	
3.	Gör vad du vill med mig	Thomas G:sson, Pontus Assarsson	
4.	Allting som jag har	Marit Bergman	
5.	Hon lämnar dörren på glänt	Daniel Lindroth	
6.	Om du längtar	Anders Larsson, Gert Lengstrand	
7.	Jag kommer imorgon	Anders Larsson, Daniel Lindroth	
7.	Ska du gå din väg (diet with Kikki Danielsson	Svante Gustavsson, Donald Brokvist	
9.	Sha La La för all Rock'n Roll	Anders Larsson, Torgny Melin	
10.	Riktig kärlek	Anders Larsson, Kjetil Granli	
11.	För dom som älskar	Urban Robertsson	
12.	Håll mig hårt	Anders Larsson, Torgny Melin	

== Charts ==
Chart (2007)	Peak position
Swedish Albums (Sverigetopplistan)	12
