= Hard to Wet, Easy to Dry =

1992 studio album by Mad Cobra

Studio album by Mad Cobra
- Released: August 25, 1992
- Genre: Dancehall
- Length: 60:15
- Label: Columbia
- Producer: Clifton Dillon; Sly Dunbar

Mad Cobra chronology
Step Aside (1992)	Hard to Wet, Easy to Dry (1992)	Goldmine (1993)

Singles from Hard to Wet, Easy to Dry
- 1. "Flex" Released: July 30, 1992; 2. "Dead End Street" Released: February 2, 1993; 3. "Legacy" Released: March 23, 1993; 4. "Mate a Talk" Released: 1993

Professional ratings
Review scores
Source	Rating
AllMusic	3/5 stars

Hard to Wet, Easy to Dry is the sixth studio album by Jamaican dancehall recording artist Mad Cobra; released August 25, 1992 via Columbia Records. It is his only album to date to appear on the Billboard 200, peaking at #125 on the chart in 1992. The album also charted at #17 on the Billboard R&B chart in 1992.

Four singles were released from Hard to Wet, Easy to Dry: "Flex", "Dead End Street", "Legacy" and "Mate a Talk". "Flex" was the most successful single from the album, peaking at #13 on the Billboard Hot 100 in 1992.

== Track listing ==
All music is composed by Clifton Dillon and Sly Dunbar.

No.	Title	Length
1.	"Mi Sorry"	3:57
2.	"Flex"	4:03
3.	"If Looks Could Kill"	3:47
4.	"Hard to Wet, Easy to Dry"	4:04
5.	"Good Body Gal"	3:46
6.	"Legacy"	4:16
7.	"Run Him"	3:52
8.	"Release"	3:50
9.	"Wet Dream"	3:55
10.	"Dead End Street"	4:10
11.	"Mate a Talk"	3:36
12.	"Minute to Pray"	5:06
13.	"Really Do It"	4:24
14.	"Glue"	3:53
15.	"Elbow"	4:09
Total length:		60:15

== Chart positions ==
Chart (1992)	Peak position
US Billboard 200	125
US Heatseekers (Billboard)	15
US R&B Albums (Billboard)	17
