= You Are Teddybears =

Studio album by Teddybears STHLM
- Released: 1993
- Genre: Hardcore punk
- Length: 35:59
- Label: MVG
- Producer: Adam Kviman & Teddybears STHLM

Teddybears STHLM chronology
| Extra Pleasure EP (1993) | You Are Teddybears (1993) | Step on It EP (1994) |

You Are Teddybears is the debut album by Teddybears STHLM. It was released in 1993 by MVG.

== Track listing ==
| No. | Title | Length |
|---|---|---|
| 1. | "Powertrip" | 3:11 |
| 2. | "Step on It" | 1:57 |
| 3. | "Goldfinger" | 3:03 |
| 4. | "Silicon Sally" | 1:43 |
| 5. | "At the Dentist's" | 1:10 |
| 6. | "Incapacitation" | 2:16 |
| 7. | "Backbite" | 2:08 |
| 8. | "The Art Sucks It Up" | 3:04 |
| 9. | "Move It Vomit" | 0:37 |
| 10. | "Taken by Surprise" | 1:40 |
| 11. | "Big Stuff" | 2:02 |
| 12. | "In the Bus" | 0:59 |
| 13. | "Only in America" | 3:37 |
| 14. | "Global Motor Seizure" | 2:37 |
| 15. | "Gimme No Producer" | 2:31 |
| 16. | "Fuse" | 2:13 |
| 17. | "Flyman" | 1:11 |
| Total length: | | 35:59 |

== Musicians ==
- Pat (a.k.a. Patrik Arve) - vocals
- Klas (a.k.a. Klas Åhlund) - guitar
- Glenn (a.k.a. Glenn Sundell) - drums
- Jocko (a.k.a. Joakim Åhlund) - bass

=== Special guest appearances ===
- Jean-Louis Huhta
- David Nyström
- DJ Zeb
