= Fresh (Teddybears album) =

Studio album by Teddybears STHLM
- Released: 2004
- Genre: Electropop; indietronica; hip hop; alternative rock; reggae fusion; pop-rap
- Length: 43:06
- Label: Epic
- Producer: Fabian "Phat Fabe" Torsson and Teddybears STHLM

Teddybears STHLM chronology
Rock 'n' Roll Highschool (2000)	Fresh (2004)	Soft Machine (2006)

Fresh is the fourth studio album by Teddybears STHLM. It was released in 2004 by Epic Records. In 2005, Fresh was re-released by Sony Records, dropping the last song "Alma" of the track listing.

The album has been released with two alternative covers: one depicting the band members with a white backdrop along with the band name and one with album title and band name with a black background.

== Track listing ==
1. "Cobrastyle" (feat. Mad Cobra) - 2:59
2. "Different Sound" (feat. Malte Holmberg) - 3:25
3. "Little Stereo" (feat. Daddy Boastin') - 3:04
4. "Hey Boy" (feat. Swing Fly) - 3:41
5. "The Lord's 115th Dream" (feat. Lord of Lightning) - 3:20
6. "Check" - 5:11
7. "Lil' Red Rooster vs. The Robodog" (feat. ADL) - 3:16
8. "Magic Kraut" - 5:14
9. "Black Belt" - 4:38
10. "Teddybear Music" - 3:30
11. "Alma" - 4:48
- All songs written by Teddybears STHLM, except track 1 co-written with Ewart E. Brown and Fabian Torsson, track 3 with Desmond Ballantine and Bobby Dixon, track 4 with Swing-Fly, and track 7 with Adam Batiste.

== Musicians ==
=== Teddybears STHLM ===
- Joakim Åhlund
- Klas Åhlund
- Patrik Arve

=== Additional musicians ===
- Erik Olsson - drums (tracks 1, 6 & 8), vibraphone (track 8)
- Sarah Dawn Finer - backing vocals (track 1)
- Desmond Foster - backing vocals (tracks 2 & 3)
