= Soft Machine (Teddybears album) =

Studio album by Teddybears
- Released: 12 September 2006
- Genre: Electronic rock; alternative rock; electropop; alternative dance; reggae fusion
- Length: 45:17
- Label: Big Beat/Columbia
- Producer: Teddybears & Phat Phabe

Teddybears chronology
Fresh (2004)	Soft Machine (2006)	Devil's Music (2010)

Professional ratings
Review scores
Source	Rating
AllMusic	3.5/5 stars
Pitchfork Media	5.2/10
PopMatters	5/10 stars
Rolling Stone	3.5/5 stars
Tiny Mix Tapes	1/5 stars

Soft Machine is the fifth studio album by Swedish alternative rock band Teddybears. It was released on 12 September 2006 on Big Beat Recordings and Columbia Records. It was the first album the band released under the name Teddybears, as they had previously been Teddybears STHLM.

Excluding "Intro", "Riot Going On" is the only new song from the group. The rest are reproductions of tracks found on their previous albums Fresh and Rock 'n' Roll Highschool, with "Throw Your Hands Up" renamed "Are You Feelin' It?".

== Track listing ==
No.	Title	Length
1.	"Intro"	0:24
2.	"Different Sound" (featuring Malte)	3:23
3.	"Cobrastyle" (featuring Mad Cobra)	2:59
4.	"Yours to Keep" (featuring Neneh Cherry)	3:50
5.	"Are You Feelin' It" (featuring Elephant Man)	3:19
6.	"Black Belt"	3:47
7.	"Punkrocker" (featuring Iggy Pop)	4:06
8.	"Ahead of My Time" (featuring Daddy Boastin')	4:10
9.	"Automatic Lover"	3:19
10.	"Magic Kraut"	3:43
11.	"Little Stereo" (featuring Daddy Boastin')	3:04
12.	"Riot Going On" (featuring Ebbot Lundberg)	4:18
13.	"Alma"	4:55
Total length:		45:17

Canadian Bonus Track
No.	Title	Length
14.	"Yours to Keep" (featuring Paola - Hidden track)	3:13

== Musicians ==
=== Teddybears ===
- Patrik Arve
- Joakim Åhlund
- Klas Åhlund

=== Additional musicians ===
- Sarah Dawn Finer - backing vocals (track 3)
- Annie - backing vocals (track 4)
- Irma Schultz - backing vocals (track 4)
- Andreas Kleerup - drums (track 7)
- Erik Olsson - drums & vibraphone (track 10)
- Desmond Foster - backing vocals (track 11)
