= Watati =

Promotional single by Karol G featuring Aldo Ranks

from the album Barbie the Album
- Language: Spanish
- Released: June 2, 2023
- Recorded: 2023
- Genre: Reggaeton; Latin pop
- Length: 2:46
- Label: Atlantic
- Songwriters: Carolina Giraldo; Aldo Vargas; Daniel Echavarría
- Producer: Ovy on the Drums

Music video
- "Watati" on YouTube

"Watati" is a song by Colombian singer-songwriter Karol G featuring Panamanian musician Aldo Ranks. It was released on June 2, 2023, through Atlantic Records as the first promotional single from Barbie the Album, the soundtrack to the 2023 film Barbie.

== Background ==
On May 25, 2023, the featured artists of the Barbie soundtrack were revealed, including Giraldo. On the same day, it was revealed that Ranks would also be part of the soundtrack together with Giraldo. On May 29, a snippet of the song was posted via the soundtrack's social media accounts. The song was released on June 2 without prior announcement for digital download and streaming. The back cover of the first edition vinyl of Barbie the Album misspell the track as "Watiti."

== Composition ==
"Watati" was written by Giraldo, Ranks and Ovy on the Drums, who also produced it. The song has a duration of 2 minutes and 46 seconds. "Watati" is a reggaeton song, Latin pop and Latin trap with elements of dembow and reggae in Spanish and lyrics about dancing. The title of the song is an expression created by Ranks that he mentions at the beginning of his songs.

== Music video ==
The music video for "Watati" was released on Karol G's YouTube channel on June 15, 2023, and features clips of Margot Robbie and Ryan Gosling from the film. Throughout the video, the singer is seen in different locations and in different outfits, including a green dress and a pink spacesuit. Ranks appears on a spaceship's monitor while singing his verse.

== Personnel ==
All credits are adapted from CD liner notes of Barbie the Album.

- Carolina Giraldo Navarro – songwriter
- Daniel Oviedo – songwriter
- Aldo Vargas – songwriter
- Ovy on the Drums – producer
- Rob Kinelski – mixing
- Eli Heisler – mixing assistant

== Charts ==
Chart performance for "Watati"
Chart (2023)	Peak position
Brazil Latin Airplay (Crowley Charts)	7
Central America (Monitor Latino)	16
El Salvador (Monitor Latino)	10
Guatemala (Monitor Latino)	19
Honduras (Monitor Latino)	4
Latin America (Monitor Latino)	14
Nicaragua (Monitor Latino)	18
Panama (Monitor Latino)	2
Panama (PRODUCE)	2
Spain (PROMUSICAE)	100
US Bubbling Under Hot 100 (Billboard)	25
US Hot Latin Songs (Billboard)	28
Venezuela (Record Report)	39

== Certifications ==
Certifications for "Watati"
Region	Certification	Certified units/sales
Spain (Promusicae)	Gold	30,000^{‡}
^{‡} Sales+streaming figures based on certification alone.
