= Mad Cobra =

Jamaican dancehall musician

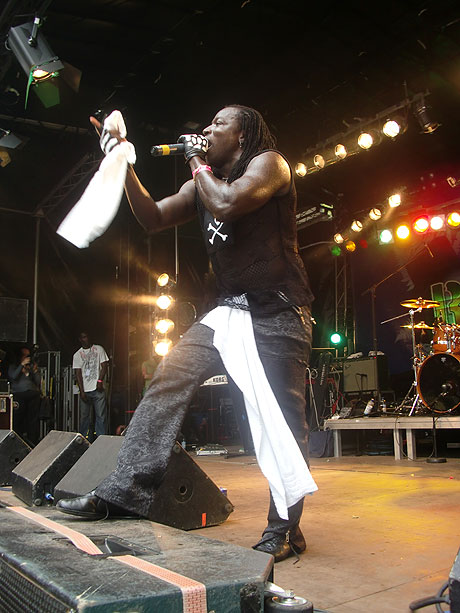
- Mad Cobra performing in 2010

Background information
- Born: Ewart Everton Brown; 31 March 1968 (age 58); Kingston, Jamaica
- Genres: Dancehall, reggae fusion
- Instrument: Vocals
- Years active: 1989–present

Ewart Everton Brown (born 31 March 1968), better known by his stage name Mad Cobra or simply Cobra, is a Jamaican dancehall musician.

== Early life ==
He was born in Kingston, Jamaica, raised in the parish of St. Mary, in Islington a settlement in the hills, north of the parish capital Port Maria. He then relocated back to the place of his birth during his teenage years. He began performing under his stage name, taken from a character in the G.I. Joe comic books, while still in his teens. He honed his talents on several local sound systems before entering the studio.

== Career ==
His first single, 1989's "Respect Woman", was produced by his uncle, Tuff Gong engineer Delroy "Spiderman" Thompson. His next single, "Na Go Work", featured Tricia McKay, giving him his first hit, and bringing him to the attention of producers Captain Sinbad and Carl Nelson. Together they released a string of hit dancehall singles, including "Shoot to Kill", "Merciless Bad Boy", and "Ze Taurus", which featured tough, gangsta rap-style lyrics in keeping with the current trends of that time.

In 1990, Cobra began working with producer Donovan Germain and songwriter Dave Kelly on the Penthouse Records label. This partnership spawned a series of major hits in Jamaica, including "Yush", "Gundelero", "Bad Boy Talk", and "Feeling Lonely" (with Beres Hammond). He released his first full-length album in 1991, entitled Bad Boy Talk, and over the next year worked with several different producers on yet more hit tracks ("O.P.P" with King Jammy, "Tek Him" with Bobby Digital, "Be Patient" with Sly & Robbie). In 1991 and 1992, Mad Cobra broke into the UK Reggae charts with five number one hits, bringing with it a backlash over concerns about the anti-gay sentiments of tracks such as "Crucifixion".

In the wake of his British success, Mad Cobra signed a deal in America with Columbia Records. His next LP was entitled Hard to Wet, Easy to Dry, and featured "Flex", a single that interpolated elements of The Temptations' "Just My Imagination". It was a smash hit, topping the US Rap Singles chart, hitting No. 7 on the R&B chart, and peaking at No. 13 on the Billboard Hot 100. The success of the single propelled the album to No. 125 on the Billboard Top 200, but the follow-up, "Legacy", failed to chart, and for the next several years Cobra's hitmaking remained primarily in Jamaica with songs such as 1993's "Mek Noise" and "Matti Haffie Move". Around this time, Cobra became involved in rivalries with fellow reggae artists Ninjaman and Buju Banton. He also made a guest appearance on rap group Run-D.M.C.'s "What's Next" on their album Down with the King.

In 1994, Cobra returned with Venom, again recording with King Jammy. Jamaican hit singles from the 1994-1995 period included "Length and Bend", "Fat and Buff", and "Selassie I Rules", now adopting "conscious" lyrics. In 1996, Columbia Records released Milkman in the US market. The album peaked at No. 12 on Billboard's Top Reggae Albums chart and featured a minor hit, "Big Long John", which charted briefly on the US Dance and R&B Singles charts. In 1997, he participated in the album Guatauba, produced by Tony Touch and Nico Canada, in the early reggaeton scene, which also featured KRS One and Mad Lion. In 1998, a track with Mr. Vegas entitled "Guns High" charted in some countries in Europe, and a number of re-releases of his Jamaican material were issued on VP. Further albums were issued in 2001 (Cobra) and 2004 (Words of Warning). Most recently, Cobra was heard on "Cobrastyle", from Teddybears' 2004 album, Fresh and reissued in 2006 on their album Soft Machine. In 2015, Cobra was featured in Major Lazer's Night Riders off their album Peace Is the Mission which also features Travis Scott, 2 Chainz and Pusha T.

== Personal life ==
On the night of 11 May 2010, Mad Cobra was shot three times in the upper body near his home in Braeton, only a day after another dancehall artist, Oneil Edwards of the group Voice Mail, was also shot in Duhaney Park. He was carried to the Spanish Town Hospital for treatment. It was later ascertained that the vehicle Mad Cobra was traveling in had shone its light on a group of men and this had angered them. When Mad Cobra came out to appease the men, he was shot. He was released from hospital later that week. On the following Monday night, his house was shot up by unknown assailants but no one was injured during the incident.

Only 25 July 2023, Mad Cobra was arrested during a traffic stop in Florence County, South Carolina, after police found two kilos of cocaine and a 9mm Beretta pistol in his vehicle.

== Discography ==
=== Albums ===
- Ex-clusive (Charm, 1991)
- Bad Boy Talk (Penthouse Records, 1991)
- Spotlight (Top Rank, 1992)
- Bad Boy Talk (Penthouse, 1992)
- Merciless Bad Boy (Sinbad, 1992)
- Hard to Wet, Easy to Dry (Columbia Records, 1992)
- Goldmine (RAS Records, 1993)
- Mister Pleasure (VP Records, 1994)
- Venom (Greensleeves Records, 1994)
- Step Aside (VP, 1994)
- Your Wish (Culture Press, 1994)
- Exclusive Decision (VP Records, 1996)
- Sexperience (Critique Records,1996)
- Playaz in Paradise (New Quest, 1996)
- Milkman (Capitol Records, 1996)
- OK Ride On (EMI, 1999)
- Cobra (Artists Only Records, 2001)
- Exclusive (Charm, 2003)
- Words of Warning (Heartbeat Records, 2004)
- Snypa Way (DJR Records, 2006)
- Helta Skelta (DJR Records, 2009)
