= Rock 'n' Roll Highschool =

Studio album by Teddybears STHLM
- Released: 2000
- Genres: Electropop; alternative rock; alternative dance; dance-punk; hip hop
- Label: MVG Records
- Producers: Fabian "Phat Fabe" Torsson & Teddybears STHLM

Teddybears STHLM chronology
| I Can't Believe It's Teddybears STHLM (1996) | Rock 'n' Roll Highschool (2000) | Fresh (2004) |

Rock 'n' Roll Highschool is the third studio album by Teddybears STHLM. It was released in 2000 by MVG. This marks the band's transition from punk rock to electronic music.

== Track listing ==
All music & lyrics written by Teddybears STHLM unless otherwise noted.

1. "Teddybears Live 'n' Direct"
2. "Rock'n'roll Highschool" (feat. Thomas Rusiak) (lyrics: Thomas Rusiak, Teddybears STHLM)
3. "Ahead of My Time" (feat. Daddy Boastin')
4. "Move Over"
5. "Punkrocker"
6. "Start at 11" (feat. Eagle-Eye Cherry)
7. "Skit 1"
8. "Automatic Lover"
9. "Tigerman"
10. "Yours to Keep" (feat. Paola)
11. "Skit 2"
12. "Throw Your Hands Up" (feat. Elephant Man & Harry Toddler) (lyrics: Patrick Jackson, O'Neil Bryan, Steven Ventura)
13. "Digital Cowboy"
14. Game for PC

== Musicians ==
=== Teddybears STHLM ===
- Tiger (Patrik Arve)
- Jocko Apa (Joakim Åhlund)
- Klas Åhlund
- Erik Olsson

=== Additional musicians ===
- DJ Viet-Naam - cuts
