= Punkrocker =

Single by Teddybears featuring Iggy Pop

from the album Soft Machine
- Released: 2006
- Studio: Apmamman Studios (Stockholm); Hit Factory Criteria (Miami)
- Genre: Synth-punk
- Length: 4:06
- Label: Big Beat
- Songwriters: Teddybears; Iggy Pop
- Producer: Teddybears

Teddybears featuring Iggy Pop singles chronology
| "Little Stereo" (2004) | "Punkrocker" (2006) | "Yours to Keep" (2006) |

Music video
- "Punkrocker" on YouTube

"Punkrocker" is a song written and originally performed by the Swedish electronic/alternative group Teddybears. The song first appeared on their 2000 album Rock 'n' Roll Highschool, and was covered later that year by Caesar's Palace (later known as Caesars), a band which also includes Teddybears member Joakim Åhlund.

The song has been covered multiple times, with the best known version internationally being a 2006 re-recording by Teddybears with American singer Iggy Pop on lead vocals, singing partially rewritten lyrics. This version appeared in a Cadillac ad campaign in 2007. It is also featured in the closing moments, extending into the closing credits, of the 2025 film Superman.

== Music video ==
The music video portrays parts of New York's skyline at nighttime. Everyone's head, except for Iggy Pop's (sitting in a car), is replaced with a bear, including the Statue of Liberty at the end of the video.

== Track listings ==
12-inch vinyl

1. "Punkrocker" (album version)
2. "Punkrocker" (instrumental)
3. "Punkrocker" (acapella)
4. "Punkrocker" (Squeak E. Clean remix)
5. "Punkrocker" (Squeak E. Clean instrumental)

== Credits and personnel ==
Credits are adapted from the liner notes of Soft Machine.

- Joakim Åhlund – producer, songwriter, mixing
- Klas Åhlund – producer, songwriter, mixing
- Patrik Arve – producer, songwriter, mixing
- Iggy Pop – songwriter, lead vocals (2006 version only)
- MixInc – mixing
- Andreas Kleerup – drums
- Chris Athens – mastering

== Notable covers ==
The song has been performed by:

- Caesar's Palace on the album Cherry Kicks (2000)
- Thomas Rusiak featuring Teddybears STHLM as "Hiphopper" on the album Magic Villa (2000)
- Slagsmålsklubben as "Synthpopper" on the album Fest i valen - Edition (2001)
- Torgny Melins as "Dansbander" on the album Dansbander (2006), also released as a single the same year
- Teddybears featuring Iggy Pop on the album Soft Machine (2006)
- Träd, Gräs och Stenar on the album Homeless Cats (2009)
- Snutjävel as "Punksvin" CDS (2010)
- Crazy & the Brains on the single Punk Rocker (2021)
- Slamgubbe by Dom Viktiga Skorna, from the album Är det så fel (2021)

== Usage in pop culture ==
The Teddybears' single, "Punkrocker" (featuring Iggy Pop), is featured in a Cadillac television commercial directed by Daniel Askill, titled 'Roll' and features a time-line of Cadillac automobiles, from the original 1902 Cadillac to the 2007 Cadillac XLR sports convertible. The song also appeared in the background of a scene of NBC's Bionic Woman.

Thomas Rusiak's version "Hiphopper" can be heard in Kevin Smith's 2001 film Jay and Silent Bob Strike Back.

The 2016 video game Mark McMorris Infinite Air includes this song as a part of its tracklist.

The song is featured in the end credits of the 2025 DC Universe film Superman. The song serves as a callback to an earlier scene in the film, in which Lois Lane (portrayed by Rachel Brosnahan) describes herself as "punk rock" due to her cynicism, while describing her boyfriend Clark Kent (portrayed by David Corenswet), as more kind and trusting, to which Clark replies "maybe [kindness and trust are] the real punk rock." Iggy Pop expressed his approval of the song's inclusion to The Hollywood Reporter, saying "I always thought the track had soul. Superman is the best friend you could have.”

== Charts ==
Chart performance for "Punkrocker"
| Chart (2025) | Peak position |
|---|---|
| Australia Digital Tracks (ARIA) | 44 |
| Ireland (IRMA) | 32 |
| UK Singles (Official Charts) | 55 |
| US Bubbling Under Hot 100 (Billboard) | 9 |
| US Hot Rock & Alternative Songs (Billboard) | 20 |
