= Thomas Rusiak =

Swedish rapper (born 1976)

Thomas Rusiak (Swedish pronunciation: [ˈrǔːʂak]; born Erik Thomas Sihlberg 8 November 1976) is a Swedish rapper, hip hop producer, musician and singer. Rusiak's father was Polish jazz saxophonist Alfred Banasiak. Rusiak was initially a member of the Stockholm-based hiphop group Sherlock and later closely associated with the Swedish rapper Petter, with whom Rusiak worked as a producer and occasional supporting rapper. Rusiak launched his solo career in 2000 with several prominent Swedish artists contributing to his debut album Magic Villa, including Titiyo, Teddybears STHLM and award winning producer Christian Falk.

== Discography ==
=== Solo albums ===
- Magic Villa (2000) (Peaked at No. 9 on the Swedish album chart on 10 August 2000)
- In the Sun (2003)

=== With Sherlock ===
- Made to Measure (1997)

=== Singles ===
- "Hiphopper" (feat Teddybears STHLM) (Version of Teddybears STHLM's "Punkrocker"), EU #100
- "Whole Lot of Things" Legends of the fall

=== Selected production credits ===
- Slick Rick – The Art of Storytelling (1 track)
- Petter – P (8 tracks)

== See also ==
- Swedish hip hop
