= Aldo Ranks =

Panamanian musician (born 1973)

- Born: Aldo Vargas; May 19, 1973 (age 53); Panama City, Panama
- Genres: Reggae en Español, reggaeton
- Occupations: Singer, rapper, songwriter
- Instrument: Vocals
- Years active: 2003–present
- Label: Panama Music
- Website: Panama Music

Aldo Vargas, known by his stage name Aldo Ranks, is a Panamanian musician of reggae en Español. Ranks joined the label Panama Music.

== History ==
Ranks achieved great success in 2003 and 2004 with "The Fire", a song that fuses Caribbean rhythms and cadence inviting the body to "move to the erotic rhythm notes & the rap and reggae rhythm". He then embarked on a tour of South America. He then went on to produce songs such as "The Party", "Pa Rum to the World", "Carousing", and "I Cannot Forget You".

In 2006, he released his third album with the hits "The Undertakers", "The Street" and "The Helicopter". His fourth promotional single "The Nipper" became the official anthem of the Panamanian Carnival. A year later, Ranks performed the same feat once again, with production by DJ Greg on the song of that year's carnival.

In 2009, Ranks received an award from the American Society of Composers, Authors and Publishers (ASCAP) for his collaboration on the composition of "Forgive", performed by The Factory and Eddy Lover.

In 2009, he released "Trac Trac Trucutu", with a difference in style, mixing reggae with electronic beats. The songs "Make Love" and "Drunkenness 2" are a blend of roots with soca.

In 2010, Ranks collaborated with another Panamanian artist, Arthur, on a record in a retro reggae style, again under the production of producer DJ Greg.

== Discography ==
=== Albums ===
- Different (2003)
- What's New and Best (2006)
- The Conquest (2007)
- Parrandero (2012)

=== Singles ===
- "Mueve Mami" (2003)
- "The Pliers" (2007)
- "Make Love" (2009)
- "Re" (with the participation of Arthur) (2010)
- "Trac Trac Trucutu" (2013)
- "Drunkenness" (2013)
- "Drunkenness 2" (2013)
- "You Are Either Rich" (2013)
- "Bien Loco Loco" (2016)
- "Cerveza y Guaro" (2016)
- "Watati" (with Karol G) (2023)

== See also ==
- Reggae en Español
- Reggaeton
