= Teddybears (band) =

Swedish alternative rock band

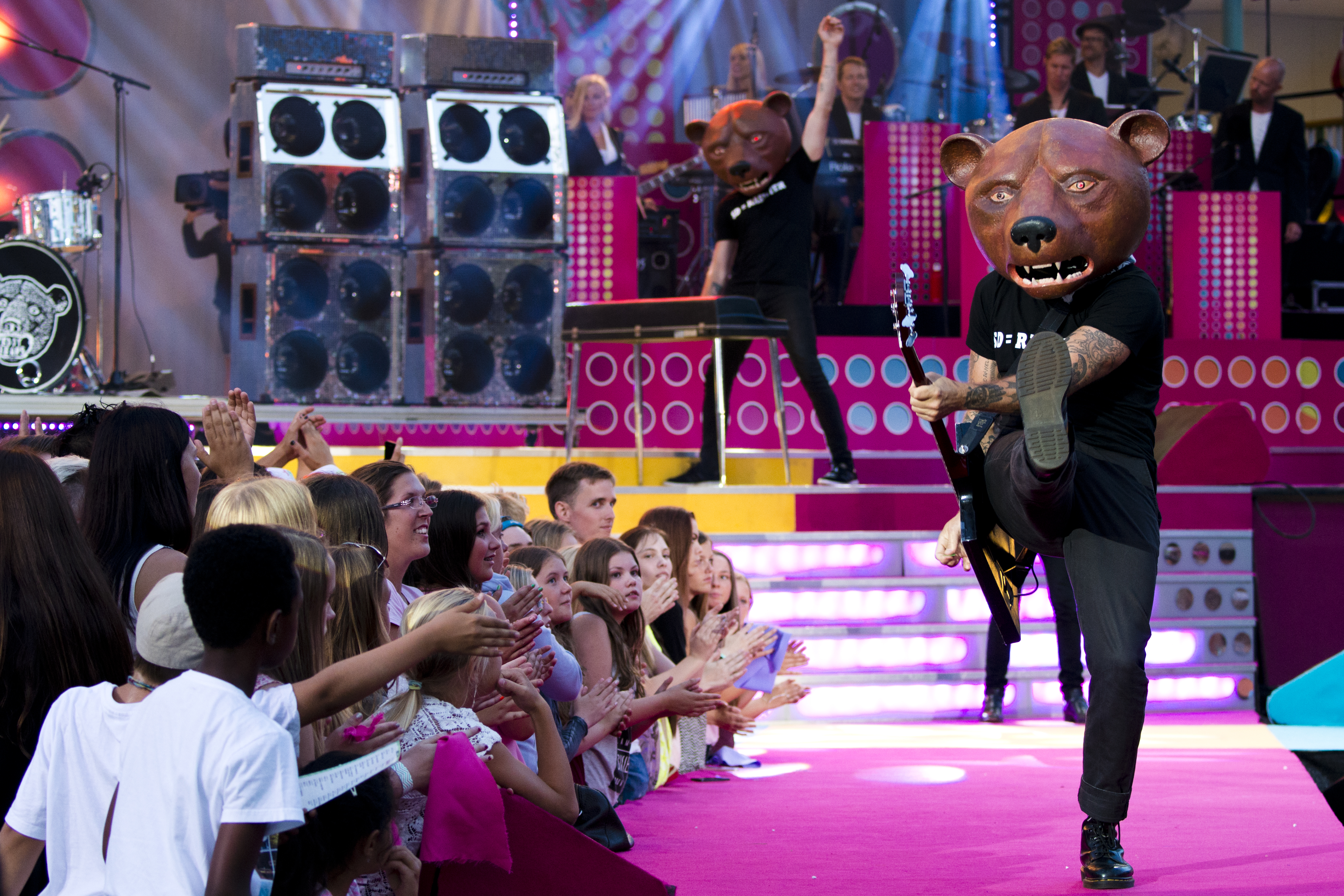
- Teddybears on Sommarkrysset 2014

Background information
- Also known as: Skull; Teddybears STHLM
- Origin: Stockholm, Sweden
- Genres: Rock; electronica; alternative rock; hardcore punk (early)
- Years active: 1991–present
- Labels: Atlantic; BMG Rights Management
- Members: Patrik Arve; Joakim Åhlund; Klas Åhlund
- Past members: Patrik Lindqvist; Martin Renck; Glenn Sundell; Erik Olsson; Yari Jimenez; Sebastian Woolgar

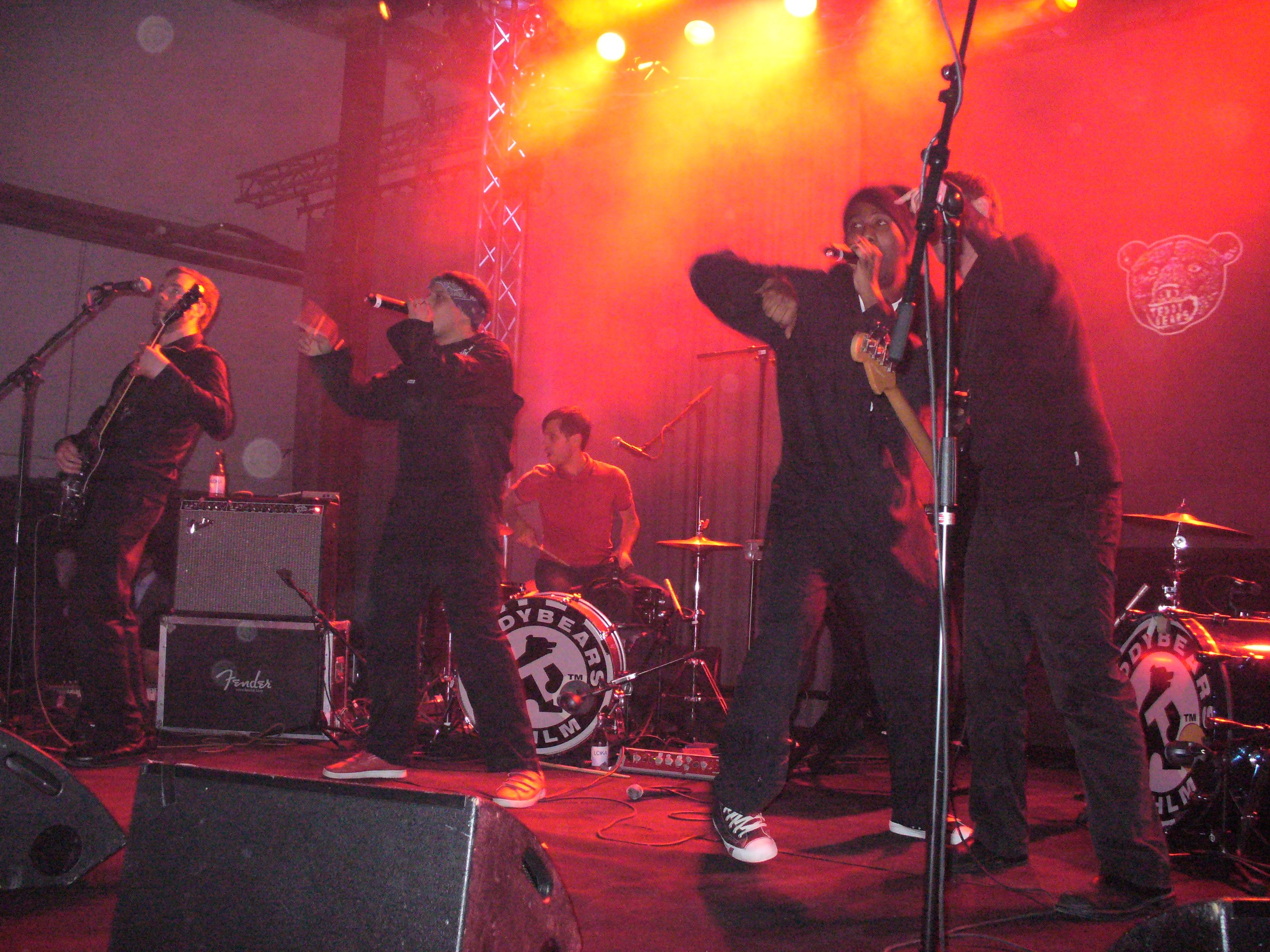
Teddybears without bear heads, performing at a TV3 Sweden event in Stockholm on November 16, 2006.

Teddybears (formerly Teddybears STHLM) is a Swedish music group formed in Stockholm in 1991. The group consists of members Patrik Arve, Joakim Åhlund, and Klas Åhlund. Initially starting as a hardcore punk band, Teddybears began to incorporate a variety of sounds from hip hop, pop, rock, dancehall, and electronica after a few years.

The band was originally named Skull but changed its name to Teddybears Sthlm shortly before Klas Åhlund joined the group. In 2006, the band dropped "STHLM" from its name and became simply Teddybears.

== Career ==
=== 1991–1992 ===
Joakim Åhlund was a member of the grindcore band Skull, alongside Glenn Sundell, Patrik Lindqvist, and Jens Näsström. For a period, Åhlund left the band, and during his absence, Patrik Arve joined as the vocalist. Åhlund later returned, and it was then that he got to know Arve, leading to the band changing its name from Skull to Teddybears Sthlm. In an interview with Göteborgs-Tidningen, Joakim Åhlund explained the reason behind the name change: "We wanted to avoid clichés; stuff like Kill Death Fuck Squad Bunch Murder and ... well, that kind of thing. And actually, it's better to call ourselves Teddybears in that case." The addition of "Sthlm" was intended to indicate their origins, with Patrik Arve noting in the same interview that the idea came from "the rockers and their vests. It also annoys people in Gothenburg and Malmö."

Teddybears' first public appearance took place during a Lucia celebration at a church in Farsta in 1991, where an anti-drug event was being held. The audience, consisting of seven youths and a priest, witnessed the band, led by Patrik Arve, performing with their trousers pulled down. The guitarist for this gig was Reine Fiske, who is now a member of Dungen and Träd, Gräs och Stenar.

The band's debut record, Women in Pain, was released in 1991 on Isse Samie's record label, Dolores Recordings, in Gothenburg. Women in Pain, which sold over 7,000 copies, included tracks such as "The King Lives On" (about Elvis Presley) and "Servants of Authority".

After several member changes, with Martin Renck playing guitar for a while, Joakim Åhlund's brother Klas joined the band. Upon their emergence on the Swedish rock scene in 1991, Teddybears were noted for their unique genre, appearances, hard music, and energetic stage performances. In February 1992, the band played at Tre Backar in Stockholm, where after the gig, Aftonbladet's critic Anna Björkman lauded their performance, writing: "music in machine gun form and when Teddybears play live, the fans stage dive unrestrainedly from the about half-meter high Tre Backar stage."

Later that year, the band signed a record deal with MVG Records and released the EP Extra Pleasure on the label in 1993.

=== 1993–1999 ===
==== You Are Teddybears (1993) ====
Teddybears' debut album, You Are Teddybears (released by MVG), was released on 15 December 1993. The band initially sought Michael B Tretow, famed for his work with ABBA, to produce the album, but he declined. Consequently, Teddybears took on the production role themselves. The album, clocking in at 37 minutes, has a hardcore punk sound across its 17 tracks. Its cover art features a pentagram in blue and yellow, the colors of the Swedish flag. Joakim Åhlund expressed his astonishment in Göteborgs-Tidningen that the controversial symbol had not sparked more reactions, highlighting it as "a devil's star in the colours of the Swedish flag".

The album elicited varied reactions from the press. Sound Affects magazine described it as "The most painful earache Svensson has ever encountered. A definite investment." In contrast, guitarist Yngwie Malmsteen offered a less favorable review in Metal Zone magazine, disparagingly commenting, "sucks ass! (...) Polka beat on the drums! A singer that blows into the mic! Damn, I hate this kind of stuff!"

==== I Can't Believe It's Teddybears Sthlm (1996) ====
For Teddybears' second album, I Can't Believe It's Teddybears Sthlm (MVG), Christian Falk was hired as the producer. The album was released on 23 February 1996. This period also saw Erik Olsson replacing Glenn Sundell on drums.

I Can't Believe It's Teddybears Sthlm includes a cover of Kraftwerk's "The Robots", which they began performing while touring in Germany. Two of the songs on the album have boy's names. "Jim" is named after Joakim's son, and the final song "Boris" is named after Patrik's favorite author, Boris Vian.

=== 2000–2005 ===
==== Rock 'n' Roll Highschool (2000) ====
With the release of Rock 'n' Roll Highschool (MVG/MNW), the band achieved commercial breakthrough. The album reached first place on the Swedish album chart. During the Grammis Awards in 2001, the band was awarded four Grammis, among them for Album of the Year and Pop/Rock Group of the Year. The jury's motivation read: "besides being a wonderful melting pot of all new music, Teddybears succeed in chiseling out several big hits."

Rock 'n' Roll Highschool was released on 7 June 2000, and was produced by the band themselves along with Fabian Torsson. The album name is taken from the movie Rock 'n' Roll High School (1979), in which the Ramones, among others, appeared. With the album, the band left hardcore punk behind in favour of a distinctive version of electronic pop with elements of hip-hop and reggae.

"Rock 'n' Roll Highschool" and "Yours to Keep" were released as singles. The song "Punkrocker" was also recorded that same year by Joakim Åhlund's other band, Caesars Palace, as well as by Thomas Rusiak featuring Teddybears, under the title "Hiphopper".

==== Fresh (2004) ====
Four years later, the fourth album Fresh (Sony Music) was released on 26 March 2004. Like the previous album, it was produced by the band themselves along with Fabian Torsson.

The fixed roles that the band members previously had were now essentially completely dissolved. Dagens Nyheter wrote on 23 March 2004: "Klas is not just a guitarist, often not at all. Joakim doesn't play the bass any more than anyone else in Teddybears, he believes. And the singer Patrik Arve – never sings." On Fresh, the vocalist changes with each song, and among the contributors is Mad Cobra on "Cobrastyle" and a mysterious street musician the band found, who called himself Lord of Lightning, guest sings on "The Lord's 115th Dream".

Fresh includes the song "Cobrastyle", which has been streamed over 90 million times on Spotify. The song appeared in the movies Employee of the Month and Snakes on a Plane from 2006, commercials for Heineken and WWE (American wrestling), the TV series Entourage, and in the video games FIFA 06, FIFA 23, and Forza Motorsport 2. Charli XCX sampled Robyn's version of "Cobrastyle" for the song "Speed Drive" on Barbie the Album.

The music video for "Cobrastyle", shot in Cuba with Mad Cobra at the Cuban film institute Instituto Cubano del Arte e Industria Cinematográficos (ICAIC), features a stop-motion gorilla and robot cobra battling it out in front of a mountain range, providing a visual backdrop to Teddybears and Mad Cobra's performance.

=== 2006–present ===
In 2005, Teddybears began to wear bear masks on stage and in media contexts. The masks were not just a visual idea but also freed up time for the band members: "Being an artist can sometimes feel like being in Top Model. You go around in a tour bus and do press and spend a lot of time discussing with stylists and getting makeup done for concerts and TV appearances. We decided to eliminate that part by always wearing bear heads."

The origin of the bear masks comes from Ingmar Bergman's 1975 film The Magic Flute, where the first bear mask appeared. It was when Patrik Arve shared a studio with the artist and puppet maker Arne Högsander, the creator of the papier-mâché bear mask for Bergman, that Teddybears ordered several of the same kind.

In 2006, the band dropped "Sthlm" from their name and became simply "Teddybears".

==== Soft Machine (2006) ====
With Teddybears' fifth album Soft Machine, they made their album debut in the United States on Atlantic Records. The album was released on 12 September 2006, and was a special edition for the American market where one of the guest artists is Iggy Pop, who guest sings on "Punkrocker" which has been streamed over 105 million times on Spotify. The album was praised in the American cultural magazine Entertainment Weekly as "the very distillation of sunshine".

Soft Machine contains six tracks from Fresh, five remixed hits from Rock 'n' Roll Highschool, and one entirely new song, "Riot Going On", where Ebbot Lundberg sings.

In 2004, Teddybears hired the Värmland orchestra Torgny Melins as the opening act for one of their concerts to perform dance band interpretations of Teddybears songs, including "Punkrocker" renamed to "Dansbander". The performance was a success for Torgny Melins, and the dance band released a whole album of Teddybears interpretations that same year, called "Dansbander".

With Soft Machine, Teddybears toured North America and Mexico. In 2007, the band played on the third day of the Coachella Music Festival 2007, which took place at Empire Polo Field in Indio, California. That same year, they performed on Jimmy Kimmel Live! where they played in the same episode as Alice Cooper. In 2008, they appeared on "The Late Show with David Letterman" and performed the song "Cobrastyle" together with Robyn.

==== Devil's Music (2010) ====
Teddybears' sixth album Devil's Music (Sony Music) was released on 24 March 2010. This album also features several guest artists, including world stars Cee Lo Green, The Flaming Lips, The B-52's, and Eve, along with Swedish names such as Mapei, Rigo, ADL, and Desmond Foster.

In Dagens Industri, Jan Gradvall wrote the following about the album: "Artists who in this way combine 'state of the art' production and classic pop songwriting with adrenaline, anarchism, attack – and also have a visual thinking – are extremely rare."

On 22 January 2010, Teddybears opened the P3 Gold Gala at the Scandinavium, premiering the song "Rocket Scientist" from the album.

==== Don Carlos ====
On 31 May 2010, Teddybears presented the set Teddybears vs Don Carlos on the main stage of the Royal Dramatic Theatre (Dramaten) together with actors from the Don Carlos ensemble. Johanna Paulsson, a critic for Dagens Nyheter, wrote about the performance: "Just making something so retrospective sound innovative is an achievement in itself, and Teddybears at the theater are far from being party animals. For this kind of project, they don't even need celebrity guest vocalists, not even the actors on stage. The bears have never sounded so multi-layered before."

The year before, Klas Åhlund had written the music for Staffan Valdemar Holm's original production of Schiller's Don Carlos. The music from the performance was recorded by Teddybears and released as a vinyl album that was only sold at the Dramaten performance.

==== Rock On! (2016) ====
On 22 January 2016, Teddybears released their sixth and latest album Rock On!. The album was recorded in Los Angeles, Atlanta, London, and Jamaica. Among the guest artists on the album are Beenie Man, Cutty Ranks, and Ninja Man, as well as former Boyz in da Hood member Gorilla Zoe, and then 12-year-old Baby Trish who sings on "What's Your Problem?"

Baby Trish came to Sweden to record a music video for "What's Your Problem?" as well as to perform with Teddybears at the 2015 Grammis Awards. The band used the performance to make a statement against racism. Words related to sexual orientation, ethnic origin, and religious affiliation followed by an equal sign and the word "Swedish" were projected on screens around the stage. This was in response to a statement by Björn Söder in which he had spoken about who was ethnically Swedish or not.

In 2014, Teddybears made a similar statement when they printed band merchandise with the text "SD = racists" which they used during a performance on the TV4 program Sommarkrysset.

On 30 January 2017, the documentary You Are Teddybears premiered at the Gothenburg Film Festival and on 23 July 2017, it was broadcast on SVT. The documentary was directed by John Boisen and Björn Fävremark.

== Usage in other media ==
"Punkrocker" (featuring Iggy Pop) was featured as the ending theme of the 2025 film Superman.

== Discography ==
=== Studio albums ===
Title	Details	Peak chart positions			Certifications
Title	Details	SWE	US Heat	US Elec.	Certifications
You Are Teddybears (as Teddybears STHLM)	Released: 1993; Label: MVG; Formats: CD, LP	35	—	—	
I Can't Believe It's Teddybears Sthlm (as Teddybears STHLM)	Released: 1996; Label: MVG; Formats: CD, LP	31	—	—	
Rock 'n' Roll Highschool (as Teddybears STHLM)	Released: 2000; Label: MVG; Formats: CD, LP	1	—	—	IFPI SWE: Gold
Fresh (as Teddybears STHLM)	Released: 2004; Label: Epic; Formats: CD, LP	8	—	—	IFPI SWE: Gold
Soft Machine	Released: 12 September 2006; Label: Big Beat, Columbia; Formats: CD, LP	—	39	13	
Devil's Music	Released: 24 March 2010; Label: Sony Music; Formats: Digital download, CD, LP	10	44	—	
Musik Ur Teaterföreställningen Don Carlos	Released: May 31, 2010; Label: Columbia, Sony Music; Formats: Digital download, LP	15	—	—	
Rock On!	Released: 24 March 2010; Label: Universal; Formats: Digital download, CD, LP	15	—	—	
"—" denotes a recording that did not chart or was not released in that territory.

=== EPs ===
- "Woman in Pain" (as Teddybears Sthlm, 1991)
- "Extra Pleasure" (as Teddybears Sthlm, 1993)

=== Singles ===
==== As lead artist ====
List of singles, with selected chart positions, showing year released and album name
Title	Year	Peak chart positions										Album
Title	Year	SWE	AUS DL	GRE	HUN	IRE	NL	UK	US Bub.	US Pop	US Rock	Album
"Woman in Pain"	1991	—	—	—	—	—	—	—	—	—	—	Woman in Pain
"Step on It (We Are the Best!)"	1994	—	—	—	—	—	—	—	—	—	—	You Are Teddybears
"Purple Rain"	1995	—	—	—	—	—	—	—	—	—	—	Non-album single
"The Robots"	1996	—	—	—	—	—	—	—	—	—	—	I Can't Believe It's Teddybears Sthlm
"Magic Finger"	1996	44	—	—	—	—	—	—	—	—	—	I Can't Believe It's Teddybears Sthlm
"Ahead of My Time"	1999	44	—	—	—	—	—	—	—	—	—	Rock 'n' Roll Highschool
"Yours to Keep"	2000	48	—	—	—	—	—	—	—	—	—	Rock 'n' Roll Highschool
"Automatic Lover"	2000	41	—	—	—	—	—	—	—	—	—	Rock 'n' Roll Highschool
"Punkrocker"	2000	—	—	—	—	—	—	—	—	—	—	Rock 'n' Roll Highschool
"Rock'n'Roll Highscool" (featuring Thomas Rusiak)	2000	40	—	—	—	—	—	—	—	—	—	Rock 'n' Roll Highschool
"Cobrastyle" (featuring Mad Cobra)	2004	10	—	1	34	—	73	—	—	89	—	Fresh
"Hey Boy" (featuring Swing Fly)	2004	13	—	—	—	—	—	—	—	—	—	Fresh
"Little Stereo" (featuring Daddy Boastin')	2004	—	—	—	—	—	—	—	—	—	—	Fresh
"Punkrocker" (featuring Iggy Pop)	2006	—	44	—	—	32	—	55	9	—	20	Soft Machine
"Yours to Keep" (featuring Neneh Cherry)	2006	—	—	—	—	—	—	—	—	—	—	Soft Machine
"Get Mama a House" (featuring Desmond Foster)	2009	23	—	—	—	—	—	—	—	—	—	Devil's Music
"Rocket Scientist" (featuring Eve)	2010	30	—	—	—	—	—	—	—	—	—	Devil's Music
"Sunshine"	2014	—	—	—	—	—	—	—	—	—	—	Rock On!
"No More Michael Jackson"	2014	—	—	—	—	—	—	—	—	—	—	Non-album singles
"Shimmy Shimmy Style"	2014	—	—	—	—	—	—	—	—	—	—	Non-album singles
"What's Your Problem?" (featuring Baby Trish)	2015	—	—	—	—	—	—	—	—	—	—	Rock On!
"Broken Heartbeat" (featuring Beenie Man)	2015	—	—	—	—	—	—	—	—	—	—	Rock On!
"Best You Ever Had" (featuring Gorilla Zoe)	2016	—	—	—	—	—	—	—	—	—	—	Rock On!
"Hustla" (featuring Ward 21)	2018	—	—	—	—	—	—	—	—	—	—	Non-album singles
"Shimmy Shimmy Style" (featuring Petite Meller)	2018	—	—	—	—	—	—	—	—	—	—	Non-album singles
"Young, Handsome & Fast" (featuring Rakel and Rigo)	2019	—	—	—	—	—	—	—	—	—	—	Non-album singles
"—" denotes a recording that did not chart or was not released in that territory.

==== As featured artist ====
List of singles as featured artist, with selected chart positions, showing year released and album name
Title	Year	Peak chart positions				Album
Title	Year	SWE	EU	FIN	NOR	Album
"Hiphopper" (Thomas Rusiak featuring Teddybears STHLM)	2000	1	100	17	12	Magic Villa

=== Guests ===
- Thomas Rusiak – Magic Villa (2000), appears on "Hiphopper" and "STHLM's Finest"
- Daddy Boastin' – Efterlyst (2002), co-writers and producers of 4 tracks
- Robyn – The Rakamonie EP (2006), co-writers and producers of "Cobrastyle"
- Robyn – Robyn (2007, international edition), co-writers and producers of "Cobrastyle"

=== Remixes ===
- Lisa Miskovsky – "Still Alive" (Teddybears Remix)
- Marilyn Manson – "Arma-Goddamn-Motherfuckin-Geddon" (Teddybears Remix)
- Daft Punk – "Adagio for Tron" (Teddybears Remix)
- Bee Gees – "Stayin' Alive" (Teddybears Remix)
