= Body Talk Tour =

2010–11 concert tour by Robyn

- Tour by Robyn
- Promotional poster for the 2011 tour
- Associated album: Body Talk
- Start date: October 7, 2010
- End date: September 11, 2011
- Legs: 4
- No. of shows: 31 in Europe; 38 in North America; 69 total

Robyn concert chronology
- All Hearts Tour (2010); Body Talk Tour (2010–11); Do It Again Tour (2014-)

The Body Talk Tour is a concert tour by Swedish singer-songwriter Robyn. The tour was announced in conjunction with the release of her sixth studio album, Body Talk Pt. 2. Previously, Robyn toured the United States in the summer of 2010 with the All Hearts Tour. The tour began on October 7, 2010.

== Critical reception ==
Chris Riemenschneider (The Star Tribune) proclaimed the singer's performance in Minneapolis was original and well-executed stating, "Fans probably would have danced right through the floors of the downtown Minneapolis club if they hadn't also been so busy singing along to each of the dance-pop star's jilted, down-but-not-out love songs." Nicola Meighan (The Herald) gave Robyn's performance at the O_{2} ABC Glasgow 4 out of 5 stars saying, "[…]and her voice is as intimate as it is strong: lines like, "hey little star, don’t be afraid", spotlight Robyn's faculty for intergalactic yet private charm."

Kerri Mason (Billboard) praised her performance in Miami. She wrote, "On stage, she is enigmatic, an appealing sprite with a voice that coos and chirps, but with a fighter's stance and narrow eyes. Whether the song was about sexy cyborgs ('Fembot'), fearless love ('Indestructible', the next 'Body Talk' single), or the pain of rejection ('Be Mine!'), she sang each word with conviction, punctuating each beat with her own dance – a punchy hip-hop/raver style of movement usually reserved for after-hours dance floors, fearless and anonymous at the same time." Jaime Murnane (Chicago Sun-Times) called her performance in Chicago "highly energetic". She also mentions, "Robyn gives a whole new meaning to a live performance. Her signature energetic dance moves aside, the show was made even more special by various remixes of her own songs, like a circus-y sounding 'Cobrastyle' from her 2005 self-titled album that introduced fans to her new electro style -- a far cry from the pop/R&B hits like 'Show Me Love' that earned her worldwide success a decade earlier."

== Opening acts ==
- Maluca Mala (North America—Leg 1)
- Natalia Kills (North America—Leg 1 & Leg 2) (select dates)
- BFGF (North America—Leg 1) (select dates)
- Diamond Rings (North America—Leg 2)
- Le Corps Mince de Françoise (Hamburg)

== Setlist ==
Europe

Leg 1

1. "Fembot"
2. "Cry When You Get Older"
3. "Cobrastyle"
4. "Hang with Me"
5. Medley: "We Dance to the Beat" / "Don't Fucking Tell Me What to Do"
6. "Love Kills"
7. "Indestructible"
8. "The Girl and the Robot"
9. "Dancing on My Own"
10. "Dream On"
11. "With Every Heartbeat"

Encore:

12. "In My Eyes"
13. "Konichiwa Bitches"
14. "Be Mine!"
15. "Dancehall Queen" (contains excerpts from "Dancing Queen")
16. "Show Me Love"

Leg 2

1. "Time Machine"
2. "Fembot"
3. "Bad Gal"
4. "Cobrastyle"
5. "Dancing on My Own"
6. Medley: "We Dance to the Beat" / "Don't Fucking Tell Me What to Do"
7. "Love Kills"
8. "The Girl and the Robot"
9. "Indestructible
10. "Call Your Girlfriend"
11. "Stars 4-Ever"
12. "Get Myself Together"
13. "Dancehall Queen"
14. "Hang with Me"
15. "With Every Heartbeat"

Encore

16. "U Should Know Better"
17. "Konichiwa Bitches"
18. "Show Me Love" (contains excerpts from "Dancing Queen")

Manchester and Bristol September 2011

1. "Time Machine"
2. "Fembot"
3. "Cobrastyle"
4. "Dancing on My Own"
5. Medley: "We Dance to the Beat" / "Don't Fucking Tell Me What to Do"
6. "Love Kills"
7. "The Girl and the Robot"
8. "Indestructible
9. "Hang with Me"
10. "Stars 4-Ever"

Encore 1

11. "Be Mine!"
12. "Call Your Girlfriend"
13. "With Every Heartbeat"

Encore 2

14. "U Should Know Better"
15. "Konichiwa Bitches"
16. "Dancing Queen"
17. "Show Me Love"

Notes

- "U Should Know Better", "Konichiwa Bitches" and "Dancing Queen" were not performed at the Manchester concert on 9 September 2011. "Show Me Love" contained excerpts from "Dancing Queen".
North America

Leg 1

1. "Fembot"
2. "Include Me Out"
3. "Cobrastyle"
4. "Indestructible"
5. Medley: "We Dance to the Beat" / "Don't Fucking Tell Me What to Do"
6. "Love Kills"
7. "The Girl and the Robot"
8. "Hang with Me"
9. "Dancing on My Own"
10. "Be Mine!"

Encore:

11. "U Should Know Better"
12. "Konichiwa Bitches"
13. "In My Eyes"
14. "With Every Heartbeat"
15. "Dancehall Queen" (contains excerpts from "Dancing Queen")
16. "Show Me Love"

Leg 2

1. "Time Machine"
2. "Fembot"
3. "Cobrastyle"
4. "Dancing on My Own"
5. Medley: "We Dance to the Beat" / "Don't Fucking Tell Me What to Do"
6. "Love Kills"
7. "The Girl and the Robot"
8. "Indestructible
9. "Call Your Girlfriend"
10. "Stars 4-Ever"
11. "Get Myself Together"
12. "Dancehall Queen"
13. "Hang with Me"
14. "With Every Heartbeat"

Encore

15. "U Should Know Better"
16. "Konichiwa Bitches"
17. "Show Me Love" (contains excerpts from "Dancing Queen")

Notes

- "When Doves Cry" was performed in lieu of 'Dancehall Queen" during the concert at the Fine Line Music Cafe in Minneapolis, Minnesota.
- "Time Machine", "Stars 4-Ever", "Get Myself Together", and "Dancehall Queen" were not performed at the concert at Echo Beach in Toronto, Ontario or concert at the Royal Oak Music Theatre in Royal Oak, Michigan.

== Tour dates ==
Date	City	Country	Venue
Europe
October 7, 2010	Oslo	Norway	Sentrum Scene
October 8, 2010	Copenhagen	Denmark	Folketeatret
October 9, 2010	Amsterdam	Netherlands	Paradiso
October 10, 2010	Hamburg	Germany	Große Freiheit 36
October 12, 2010	Luxembourg	Luxembourg	Den Atelier
October 13, 2010	Brussels	Belgium	Botanique
October 15, 2010	Warsaw	Poland	Wytwórnia "Koneser"
October 18, 2010	Glasgow	Scotland	O_{2} ABC Glasgow
October 19, 2010	Manchester	England	Manchester Academy
October 21, 2010	Brighton	England	Concorde 2
October 22, 2010	London	England	O_{2} Shepherd's Bush Empire
North America
November 5, 2010	Miami Beach	United States	The Fillmore Miami Beach
November 6, 2010	Orlando	United States	Club Firestone
November 7, 2010	Tampa	United States	The Ritz Ybor
November 8, 2010	Atlanta	United States	Buckhead Theatre
November 10, 2010	New York City	United States	Terminal 5
November 13, 2010	Chicago	United States	Metro Chicago
November 14, 2010	Minneapolis	United States	Fine Line Music Cafe
November 17, 2010	Los Angeles	United States	Club Nokia L.A. Live
November 19, 2010	Vancouver	Canada	Venue Nightclub
November 20, 2010	Portland	United States	Wonder Ballroom
November 21, 2010	Seattle	United States	Neumo's
November 23, 2010	San Francisco	United States	Warfield Theatre
December 4, 2010^{[A]}	Tunica	United States	Tunica Events Center
December 6, 2010^{[B]}	Albany	United States	Times Union Center
December 7, 2010^{[C]}	Poughkeepsie	United States	Mid-Hudson Civic Center
Europe
December 14, 2010	Stockholm	Sweden	Berns Salonger
December 17, 2010	Gothenburg	Sweden	Restaurang Trädgårn
December 18, 2010	Malmö	Sweden	Slagthuset
North America
January 26, 2011	Toronto	Canada	Sound Academy
January 27, 2011	Montreal	Canada	Métropolis
January 28, 2011	Quebec City	Canada	Impérial de Québec
January 29, 2011	Portland	United States	State Theatre
January 31, 2011	South Burlington	United States	Higher Ground
February 1, 2011	Baltimore	United States	Rams Head Live!
February 3, 2011	Philadelphia	United States	Electric Factory
February 4, 2011	Boston	United States	House of Blues
February 5, 2011	New York City	United States	Radio City Music Hall
February 7, 2011	Cleveland	United States	House of Blues
February 12, 2011	Milwaukee	United States	Rave Nightclub
February 13, 2011	Minneapolis	United States	First Avenue
February 14, 2011	Chicago	United States	Riviera Theatre
February 15, 2011	Urbana	United States	Canopy Club
February 17, 2011	Austin	United States	Moody Theater
February 18, 2011	Dallas	United States	South Side Music Hall
February 19, 2011	Houston	United States	Warehouse Live
Europe
March 3, 2011	London	England	Roundhouse
March 7, 2011	Frankfurt	Germany	Künstlerhaus Mousonturm
March 9, 2011	Cologne	Germany	Live Music Hall
March 10, 2011	Brussels	Belgium	Ancienne Belgique
March 11, 2011	Munich	Germany	Muffathalle
March 12, 2011	Berlin	Germany	Astra Kulturhaus
March 15, 2011^{[D]}	Hamburg	Germany	Studio Hamburg
March 17, 2011	Bergen	Norway	Peer Gynt Salen
March 18, 2011	Copenhagen	Denmark	Tap 1
March 19, 2011	Oslo	Norway	Oslo Spektrum
March 27, 2011	Stockholm	Sweden	Cirkus
March 28, 2011	Stockholm	Sweden	Cirkus
March 29, 2011	Stockholm	Sweden	Cirkus
March 30, 2011	Stockholm	Sweden	Cirkus
North America
April 9, 2011^{[E]}	Palm Springs	United States	Palm Springs Convention Center
April 14, 2011	Las Vegas	United States	Boulevard Pool
April 15, 2011^{[F]}	Indio	United States	Empire Polo Club
May 28, 2011^{[G]}	George	United States	The Gorge Amphitheatre
June 3, 2011	Toronto	Canada	Echo Beach
June 4, 2011	Royal Oak	United States	Royal Oak Music Theatre
June 5, 2011	Columbus	United States	Lifestyle Communities Pavilion
June 12, 2011^{[H]}	Manchester	United States	Great Stage Park
Europe
June 26, 2011^{[I]}	Pilton	England	Worthy Farm
June 29, 2011^{[J]}	Arendal	Norway	Tromøy
July 3, 2011^{[K]}	Rotselaar	Belgium	Werchter Festival Grounds
July 10, 2011^{[L]}	Turku	Finland	Ruissalo Park
August 12, 2011^{[M]}	Gothenburg	Sweden	Slottsskogen
September 9, 2011	Manchester	England	Manchester Academy
September 10, 2011	Bristol	England	O_{2} Academy Bristol
September 11, 2011^{[N]}	Isle of Wight	England	Robin Hill

Festivals and other miscellaneous performances

^{A} This concert is a part of the WHBQ 107.5 Jingle Jam
^{B} This concert is a part of the Fly 92.3 Jingle Jam
^{C} This concert is a part of the K104 Not So Silent Night
^{D} This concert is a part of Telekom Street-Gigs
^{E} This concert is a part of the White Party
^{F} This concert is a part of Coachella Valley Music and Arts Festival
^{G} This concert is a part of the Sasquatch! Music Festival

^{H} This concert is a part of the Bonnaroo Music Festival
^{I} This concert is a part of the Glastonbury Festival
^{J} This concert is a part of the Hove Festival
^{K} This concert is a part of Rock Werchter
^{L} This concert is a part of Ruisrock
^{M} This concert is a part of the Way Out West Festival
^{N} This concert is a part of Bestival

Cancellations and rescheduled shows

November 12, 2010	Toronto	Sound Academy	Postponed due to illness Date was later rescheduled to January 26, 2011.
November 27, 2010	Sydney	Sydney Showground	This date was a part of the Stereosonic Festival. The performance was postponed due to scheduling conflict. The performance and venue were due to be rescheduled to an unknown date in February 2011, however, the concert has been cancelled indefinitely.
November 28, 2010	Perth	Claremont Showground	This date was a part of the Stereosonic Festival. The performance was postponed due to scheduling conflict. The performance and venue were due to be rescheduled to an unknown date in February 2011, however, the concert has been cancelled indefinitely.
December 4, 2010	Adelaide	Bonython Park	This date was a part of the Stereosonic Festival. The performance was postponed due to scheduling conflict. The performance and venue were due to be rescheduled to an unknown date in February 2011, however, the concert has been cancelled indefinitely.
December 5, 2010	Melbourne	Prince Ballroom	The performance and venue were due to be rescheduled to an unknown date in February 2011, however, the concert has been cancelled indefinitely.
February 8, 2011	Columbus	Lifestyle Communities Pavilion	Postponed, rescheduled to June 5, 2011
February 9, 2011	Royal Oak	Royal Oak Music Theatre	Postponed then rescheduled to June 4, 2011
February 11, 2011	Chicago	Riviera Theatre	Rescheduled to February 14, 2011
March 4, 2011	Bristol	O_{2} Academy Bristol	Postponed, rescheduled to September 10, 2011
March 5, 2011	Manchester	Manchester Academy	Postponed, rescheduled to September 9, 2011
March 15, 2011	Bergen	Peer Gynt Salen	This performance has been moved to March 17, 2011

=== Box office score data ===
Venue	City	Tickets sold / available	Gross revenue
Metro Chicago	Chicago	1,158 / 1,158 (100%)	$22,002
Club Nokia L.A. LIVE	Los Angeles	2,340 / 2,340 (100%)	$67,964
Warfield Theatre	San Francisco	1,852 / 2,254 (82%)	$47,914
Métropolis	Montreal	$204,155	
Royal Oak Mutre	Royal Oak	1,213 / 1,250 (97%)	$24,412
TOTAL		14,652 / 15,091 (97%)	$424,186
