= Body Talk =

Body Talk may refer to:

== Albums ==
- Body Talk (George Benson album), 1973
- Body Talk (Imagination album), 1981
- Body Talk (The Wallets album), 1988
- Body Talk Pt. 1, a 2010 mini-album by Robyn
- Body Talk Pt. 2, a 2010 mini-album by Robyn
- Body Talk Pt. 3, a 2010 mini-album by Robyn
- Body Talk (Robyn album), a 2010 album by Robyn comprising 3-part Body Talk mini-albums

== Songs ==
- "Body Talk" (The Deele song), 1983
- "Body Talk" (Foxes song), 2015
- "Body Talk" (Imagination song), 1981
- "Body Talk" (Koo De Tah song), 1985
- "Body Talk" (Majid Jordan song), 2017
- "Body Talk" (Poison song), 1993
- "Body Talk" (Ratt song), 1986
- "Body Talk", song by John Otway
- "Body Talk", song by Kix from their album Cool Kids
- "Body Talk", song by Baccara from their 1979 album Colours
- "Body Talk", song by The Knack from their 1991 album Serious Fun
- "Bodytalk", song by twlv from his 2018 EP Contents ½
- "Body Talks", a 2018 song by The Struts and Kesha

== Other ==
- Body Talk, play written by Stephen Daldry 1996
- Body Talk, 1982 hardcore adult movie starring Angelique Pettyjohn
- Body Talk, 1990 unsold game show pilot starring Vicki Lawrence

== See also ==
- Body language
