= All Hearts Tour =

2010 concert tour by Kelis and Robyn

- Tour by Kelis and Robyn
- Promotional poster for the 2010 tour
- Associated album: Flesh Tone; Body Talk Pt. 1
- Start date: July 23, 2010
- End date: August 5, 2010
- Legs: 1
- No. of shows: 9 in North America

The All Hearts Tour was a joint concert tour by American R&B singer Kelis and Swedish pop singer Robyn in support of their albums Flesh Tone and Body Talk Pt. 1, respectively. The announcement for the tour was unique in that the duo announced the tour over Twitter in the form of a conversation between the two.

The tour was supported by Dan Black, Natalia Kills and Far East Movement.

== Background ==
On May 20, 2010, Kelis and Robyn were tweeting each other on Twitter, with Kelis asking Robyn if she would want to "hit the road together." Eventually, the tweets led to naming their joint tour All Hearts. In an interview with The Huffington Post, Kelis explained the tour's name, saying, "'All Heart' is like when you say someone has a lot of heart it's brave... there's a strength and love in it, but you got guts. You're not afraid to say who you are, what you believe, and to feel comfortable in your own skin." While speaking of Robyn, she said, "Honestly, I love her album and I figured she's going on tour and I need to go on tour and we talked about it. It was just natural." While being interviewed by guest editor Kelis of Idolator, Robyn explained that the tour's name means to her, "To me, that means it all, love, and everyone’s invited!"

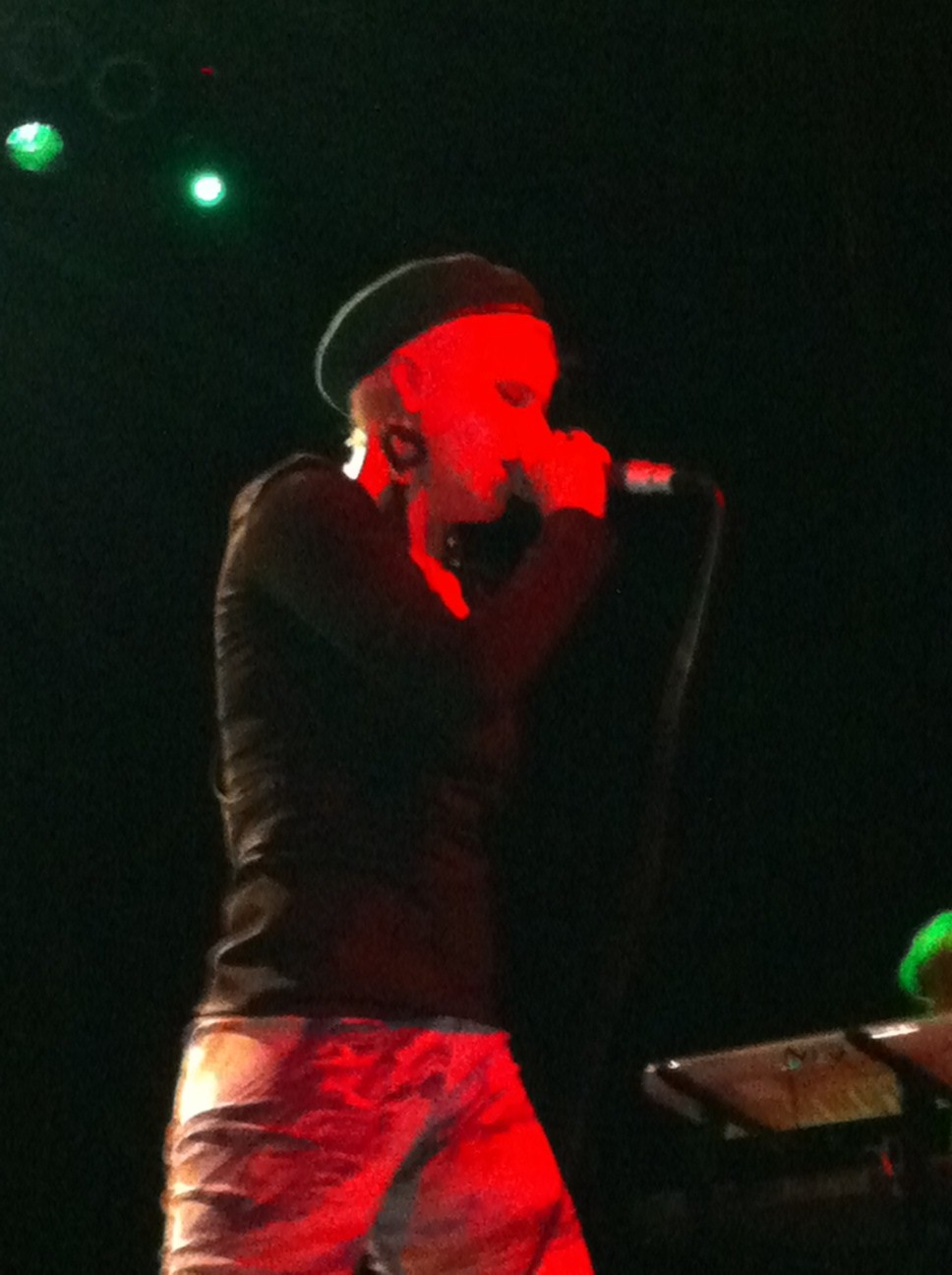
Robyn performing at House of Blues in Boston.

In an interview with Rolling Stone, four days before the tour started, Kelis revealed that she still had not decided what to include on her set list. She said, "I've been doing this for a while. It's not brain surgery. I just go with what I feel." She also revealed that it would include "a more thumping, technofied version" of her hit "Milkshake." Robyn focused more on arrangements instead of stage productions. She rehearsed in Stockholm, Sweden with two drummers and two keyboardists, and saying that her set "will be just me and them, [...] It's really straightforward." She also revealed that she would perform new songs from the then-upcoming Body Talk Pt. 2.

=== Poster contest ===
On July 2, 2010, Interscope Records and Creative Allies launched a contest in which fans could design a poster for the All Hearts Tour. The grand prize was $200 and signed copies of Body Talk Pt. 1 and Flesh Tone. Participants had until July 15, 2010 to submit their poster. On August 4, 2010, Interscope revealed the three runners-up. A day later, the winner was revealed.

== Accomplishments ==
The August 5th show at Webster Hall sold out within a week of its announcement and an extra show was added for August 4 due to demand. The shows at The Music Box, 9:30 Club and Music Hall of Williamsburg also sold out.

The July 24th show at Mezzanine in San Francisco also sold out and a July 25 show at Mezzanine was added.

The tour was ranked #19 on Spin.com's list of "Summer's 25 Must See Tours"

== Set list ==
=== Robyn ===
1. "Intro"
2. "Fembot"
3. "Cry When You Get Older"
4. "Cobrastyle"
5. "Dancing on My Own"
6. "Who's That Girl"
7. "Hang with Me (Acoustic Version)"
8. "Dancehall Queen"
9. "None of Dem"
10. "The Girl and the Robot"
11. "Don't Fucking Tell Me What to Do"
12. "Be Mine!"
13. "Show Me Love"
14. "Dream On"
15. "With Every Heartbeat"

=== Kelis ===
1. "Intro"
2. "22nd Century"
3. "Millionaire"
4. "Bossy"
5. "Emancipate"
6. "Home"
7. "Scream"
8. "Brave"
9. "Trick Me"
10. "Milkshake"
11. "Holiday"
12. "4th of July (Fireworks)"
13. "Lil' Star"
14. "Song for the Baby"
15. "Acapella" / "I Gotta Feeling" selected dates only

== Tour dates ==
Date	City	Country	Venue
North America
July 23, 2010	Los Angeles	United States	The Music Box
July 24, 2010	San Francisco	United States	Mezzanine
July 25, 2010	San Francisco	United States	Mezzanine
July 27, 2010	Boston	United States	House of Blues
July 28, 2010	New York City	United States	Williamsburg Hall of Music
August 2, 2010	Washington, D.C.	United States	9:30 Club
August 3, 2010	Philadelphia	United States	Trocadero Theatre
August 4, 2010	New York City	United States	Webster Hall
August 5, 2010	New York City	United States	Webster Hall
