= Indestructible (Robyn song) =

Single by Robyn

from the album Body Talk
- Released: 1 November 2010
- Recorded: Apmamman Studios (Stockholm, Sweden)
- Genre: Synth-pop; Europop
- Length: 3:40
- Label: Konichiwa
- Songwriters: Robyn; Klas Åhlund
- Producer: Klas Åhlund

Robyn singles chronology
"Hang with Me" (2010)	"Indestructible" (2010)	"Cardiac Arrest" (2011)

Music video
- "Indestructible" on YouTube

"Indestructible" is a song by Swedish recording artist Robyn, taken from her seventh studio album Body Talk (2010). The song was written by Robyn and Klas Åhlund, and produced by Åhlund. It was released as the lead single from Body Talk on 1 November 2010 in Sweden and one day later in the United States. The song was previously heard, in an acoustic form, as the final track on Body Talk Pt. 2, released in September 2010. The song was one of the first to be recorded for the Body Talk series, but Robyn saved it for later to give it a chance of becoming a single.

According to Robyn, "Indestructible" describes how meeting new people and falling in love can be scary and fun at the same time. The song is a synthpop ballad with string sounds, pulsing bass and an electronic arrangement. The song was met with generally positive reviews from critics, who praised its production and Robyn's songwriting. It reached number four on the Sverigetopplistan chart, becoming Robyn's ninth top ten hit in her native country. It charted moderately elsewhere, reaching number thirteen in Denmark and number twenty-one on the UK Dance Chart.

The accompanying music video was directed by Max Vitali and Nils Ljunggren. It shows scenes of couples having sex, and cutscenes of Robyn wearing a special designed dress featuring tubes with colored liquid. Robyn wanted to make the video to show the truth about sex. The dress was designed by Lucy McRae, who specializes in "body architecture". An advanced machine was built to control the flow of the liquid and a kilometre of tubes were used. The video received positive reviews from critics, who called it honest and intriguing. Robyn performed the song at the 2010 Nobel Peace Prize Concert.

== Background ==
"Indestructible" was written by Robyn and Klas Åhlund with production done by the latter. The song was recorded at a studio named Apmamman, in Stockholm, Sweden. The strings in the song were arranged by Carl Bagge, and played by various cello and violin players. The song alongside "Hang with Me" were among the first songs to be recorded for the Body Talk series, and Robyn said that she saved them for a later release because "[she] knew they would be singles, or could be singles, and [she] wanted them to get that chance." Robyn described the song to The Macomb Daily as "a love song ... about what you can do in a club". In an interview with MTV News, she elaborated on the song's theme and message, saying, "I think 'Indestructible' is a song that talks about what happens when you meet new people and fall in love, and how that can be scary and fun at the same time."

An acoustic version of the song was featured on Body Talk Pt. 2, released in September 2010. The uptempo version was announced as the first single from Body Talk on 12 October 2010, and the single artwork was released on the same date. The song premiered online on 14 October 2010, via Robyn's SoundCloud account. The single was initially planned to be released on 17 November 2010 in Sweden, but it was changed to 1 November 2010. It was released in the United States on 2 November 2010. A CD single was released in Germany on 18 February 2011.

== Composition ==
"Indestructible"
A 21-second sample of "Indestructible", featuring its strobe-like chorus and string sounds.

"Indestructible" is an uptempo ballad that uses string sections and a pulsating beat. The song makes use of a synthpop style, and incorporates elements Europop. It carries a 4/4 beat that is driven by an "endlessly looped" arpeggio. The song utilizes ascending keyboard bubbles, disco claps, drum machines and whistles as backing. The string sounds from the acoustic version of the song are accompanied by four-to-the-floor beats and an electronic arrangement, as well as "relentless" bass and pulsing synthesized chords. Molly Lambert of Pitchfork noted the "human quality" of Robyn's voice on the track, writing that it is "cloaked in waves of arpeggiated synth".

The lyrics speak of a love connection, where the protagonist makes bad decisions; "I never was smart with love, I let the bad ones in and the good ones go". In the chorus, Robyn sings "I'm gonna love you like I've never been hurt before/I'm gonna love you like I'm indestructible." Fraser McAlpine of BBC Music noted that Robyn sings "tough and knowing" and "pessimistically optimistic" lines, but manages to make it sound romantic for the listener. Emma Gaedekke of Billboard commented on the lyrical content, saying, "Robyn's heartfelt vocal turn prevents the backing music from overwhelming her story of a love connection found at the tail-end of heartbreak."

== Critical reception ==
The song was met with critical acclaim. Nick Levine of Digital Spy gave the song a positive review, awarding it five out of five stars. Levine praised the synths and strings present on the track, as well as Åhlund's production. He commented that the lyrics made the song "not just touching, but utterly, utterly life-affirming". Fraser McAlpine of BBC Music and compared it to "heartbreak songs" by ABBA, but noted its modern synthpop as opposed to 1970s disco. McAlpine noted that the song about dancing and being "terrified/upset" at the same time, and wrote that Robyn has created a "devastating happysad feeling". McAlpine awarded the song five out five stars, and gave it "special points" for its "faux-classical synth solo" in the middle. Emma Gaedeke of Billboard highlighted the songwriting and praised it for being emotionally honest, without "generic pop cheesiness". Molly Lambert of Pitchfork wrote a positive review of the song, saying that the drum machines on the track contrast well with the qualities of her voice. Lambert wrote, "“Indestructible” encapsulates the kind of freedom Robyn sings about; freedom from reductionist categories, unfair expectations, and life's daily indignities."

Paul Davey of Drowned in Sound wrote that the song "sits comfortably alongside" previous singles "Hang with Me" and "Dancing on My Own". Davey referred "Indestructible" to as "an example of a pop-innovator at the top of her game". Jonathan Keefe of Slant Magazine praised the song's production and named it one of Robyn's best singles. Keefe also named it the standout among the new songs on Body Talk. Christian Hoard of Rolling Stone gave it three and a half out of five stars, and wrote that "[Robyn] sings an uncommonly elegant Europop melody". Evan Sawdey of PopMatters compared the song negatively to the acoustic version, believing it was a bad choice to "swap out strings for synths". He wrote, "Robyn's voice gets lost amidst the laser lights, and its impact just isn't as strong". Sawdey, however, considered it "great [for] the dance floor".

== Chart performance ==
On the issue dated 17 September 2010 of the Sverigetopplistan chart, the acoustic version of "Indestructible" debuted and peaked at number fifty-four due to strong digital downloads. The original version of the song debuted at number nine on the issue dated 12 November 2010, becoming Robyn's ninth top ten hit in the country. Three weeks later, it peaked at number four. It was the thirtieth best-selling song of 2010 in Sweden. In Denmark, the song debuted at number thirty-eight on the chart issue dated 12 November 2010, but fell off the chart next week. On 3 December 2010, it re-entered at number twenty-four and peaked at number thirteen on 21 January 2011. After thirteen non-consecutive weeks, the song fell off the chart dated 4 March 2011. On 20 October 2011 the song was certified gold by the International Federation of the Phonographic Industry (IFPI) for sales of 15,000 digital units in Denmark.

"Indestructible" managed to chart at number 171 on the UK Singles Chart, on the issue dated 18 December 2010. It debuted at number thirty on the UK Dance Chart, and reached its peak of number twenty-one on its second week on the chart. In Belgium, the song peaked at number twenty-three on the Flanders Ultratop 50 chart, and number twenty-nine on the Wallonia Ultratip airplay chart. In Germany, the song debuted at number fifty-six, immediately becoming Robyn's highest-charting single in the country since "With Every Heartbeat" in 2007.

== Music video ==
Robyn wearing the "tube dress" in the music video for "Indestructible"

The music video for "Indestructible" was directed by Max Vitali and Nils Ljunggren. Vitali had previously worked with Robyn on the music videos for "Hang with Me" and "Dancing on My Own". For the video, Australian artist Lucy McRae, who makes "body architecture", designed a special "tube dress" for Robyn to wear. McRae also designed the outfits Robyn wore on the Body Talk album covers. The dress for the video was made up of plastic pipes that were periodically filled with colored fluids and wrapped around Robyn's body. Robyn recalled that the machine that kept the liquid flowing was "very complicated". It was powered by drills and required "a whole lot of complex machinery to function". The machine was built by McRae, who had to do it quickly because of the video's budget. McRae said, "Me and the dream team had never done anything like this before, the whole project was happening for the first time. The machine was super loud." The shooting stopped four times due to leaks, and the team had to mop and re-set the technology. The shooting took twenty hours, and by 3 a.m. McRae said that Robyn was wrapped "in a kilometre of tubing draped over her head and body". She praised Robyn's stamina throughout the shoot, saying that "there were chaotic moments that could have been potentially disastrous and the entire time Robyn was working with us, smiling, moving when the tubes were stuck and just super happy we were making it happen."

Due to the complex technology used to for the video, Robyn believed "It looked like 'MacGyver' on the set." She said that the video "[is] very much about [...] giving almost a physical experience of what it feels like to be on a dance floor or fall in love, whether it's blood or endorphins or other body fluids." She wanted to make a video about sex, but said that "in a way that wasn't so clichéd. [...] And [the video] is made to give you a picture of what sex really is, which I think is something that's very hard to do, because sex is everywhere all the time, but very rarely is it made out to be something real." The video begins with a reversed scene of a young couple having sex. In cutscenes, Robyn appears with a tube dress with clear liquid flowing through it. When the young woman begins to switch her sex partners, the liquid in the tubes wrapped around Robyn begins to alter colors and flow more quickly. The video ends with Robyn standing alone with black liquid in the tubes.

The music video premiered via Robyn's official Myspace account on 28 October 2010. The video received positive reviews from critics. James Montgomery of MTV News called it "a clothing-optional video that's raising eyebrows (and temperatures) worldwide. Though [...] there's nothing really all that shocking about the clip ... except maybe for its honesty." Megan Vick of Billboard was positive on the video, saying that, "We can't be entirely sure what Robyn was trying to say with this treatment, but we do know that this video is hot – and intriguing." Robbie Daw of music website Idolator compared it to a scene from The X-Files. He concluded by saying that "This is hardcore, indeed." Amber Katz of MTV Buzzworthy said that Robyn looks "cherubic and futuristic [in the video], as if she belongs on the set of “Caprica”." Katz compared Robyn's outfit to Rebecca Horn's "Overflowing Blood Machine". DJ Ron Slomowicz of About.com called the video "creepy and confusing" and said, "Overall, it is a scintillating if not entirely clear video."

== Live performances ==
On 3 November 2010, Robyn performed the song alongside several other songs on the Myspace Secret Shows in London. On 1 December 2010, she made an appearance on The 5:19 Show on BBC to perform the song. "Indestructible" was performed on 11 December 2010 at the Nobel Peace Prize Concert. The performance opened with the Swedish folk song "Jag vet en dejlig rosa" and her previous single "Dancing on My Own". Robyn was accompanied by two drummers and two keyboardist on stage, and string players later joined for "Indestructible". The stage was designed with vertical light columns that altered colors in time with the music. Two days later, she performed the song at the Svenska Hjältar awards ceremony in Sweden, broadcast on TV4. The song was mixed with the acoustic version for this performance. She also performed the song during the Body Talk Tour.

== Formats and track listings ==
- Digital download
1. "Indestructible" – 3:40
- Digital EP
1. "Indestructible" (with Laidback Luke) – 6:10
2. "Indestructible" (Max Sanna and Steve Pitron Club Remix) – 7:16
3. "Indestructible" (A-Trak Remix) – 7:07
4. "Indestructible" (Laserkraft 3D Remix) – 6:18
5. "Indestructible" (The Krays Remix) – 5:29
- Germany CD single
1. "Indestructible" (Radio Edit) – 3:22
2. "Indestructible" (Laserkraft 3D Remix) – 6:18
- Germany digital EP
1. "Indestructible" (Radio Edit) – 3:22
2. "Indestructible" – 3:42
3. "Indestructible" (Laserkraft 3D Remix) – 6:19
4. "Indestructible" (with Laidback Luke) – 6:10
5. "Indestructible" (A-Trak Remix) – 7:06
6. "Indestructible" (Acoustic Version) – 4:14
7. "Indestructible" (Music Video) – 3:27
- Sweden digital download
1. "Indestructible" (Radio Edit) – 3:22
2. "Indestructible" – 3:41
- Black Madonna Remix
1. "Indestructible" (The Black Madonna Remix) - 8:27

== Credits and personnel ==
- Robyn and Klas Åhlund – music, lyrics, production, instruments and programming
- Niklas Flyckt – mixing
- Carl Bagge – string arranging
- Marianne Herresthal and Pelle Hansen – cello
- Claudia Bonfiglioli, Erik Arvinder, Patrik Swedrup and Simona Bonfiglioli – violin

== Charts and certifications ==
=== Weekly charts ===
Chart (2010–11)	Peak position
Belgium (Ultratip Bubbling Under Wallonia)	29
Belgium (Ultratop 50 Flanders)	23
Denmark (Tracklisten)	13
Finland Download (Latauslista)	23
Germany (GfK)	56
Sweden (Sverigetopplistan)	4
UK Dance (OCC)	21
UK Singles (The Official Charts Company)	171

=== Year-end charts ===
Chart (2010)	Position
Sweden (Sverigetopplistan)	30

Chart (2011)	Position
Belgian Dance Chart (Flanders)	63
Sweden (Sverigetopplistan)	42

=== Certifications ===
Region	Certification	Certified units/sales
Denmark (IFPI Danmark)	Gold	15,000^{^}
Streaming
Denmark (IFPI Danmark)	Gold	50,000^{†}
^{^} Shipments figures based on certification alone.^{†} Streaming-only figures based on certification alone.

== Cover versions ==
In 2021, British singer Will Young covered "Indestructible" on his album Crying on the Bathroom Floor.

== Release history ==
List of release dates, showing country, formats released, and record label
Country	Release date	Format(s)	Label
Sweden	1 November 2010	Digital download	Konichiwa Records
United States	2 November 2010	Digital download	Interscope Records
Australia	12 November 2010	Digital download	Konichiwa Records
United Kingdom	5 December 2010	Digital EP	Universal Music
France	13 December 2010	Digital EP	Universal Music
Netherlands	28 January 2011	Digital EP	Universal Music
Germany	18 February 2011	CD single	Ministry of Sound
Various	1 July 2016	Remix digital single	Konichiwa
