= Body Talk (Robyn album) =

2010 studio and compilation album by Robyn

Studio album and compilation album by Robyn
- Released: 22 November 2010
- Recorded: 2009–2010
- Studios: Apmamman (Stockholm) (Note: Tracks 1, 2, 4, 6–8 and 10–15); Maratone (Stockholm) (Note: Track 5); Östberga (Note: Track 6); The Record Plant (Los Angeles) (Note: Track 11); Kleerup's flat (Note: Track 14); Svenska Grammofonstudion (Gothenburg); Shortlist (Stockholm)
- Genres: Electropop; synth-pop; dance-pop
- Length: 61:40
- Label: Konichiwa
- Producers: Jocke Åhlund; Klas Åhlund; Patrik Berger; Diplo; Douster; Kleerup; Max Martin; Niggaracci (Note: Niggaracci is a pseudonym for Snoop Dogg.); Röyksopp; Savage Skulls; Shellback

Robyn chronology
Body Talk Pt. 2 (2010)	Body Talk (2010)	Body Talk Pt. 3 (2010)

Singles from Body Talk
- 1. "Indestructible" Released: 1 November 2010; 2. "Call Your Girlfriend" Released: 1 April 2011

Body Talk is the seventh studio album (fifth internationally released) by Swedish singer Robyn, released on 22 November 2010 by Konichiwa Records. Robyn first announced in early 2010 that she would release three mini-albums throughout the course of 2010. However, it was later announced that a full-length album would be released instead of a third mini-album. The first two mini-albums of what was dubbed the Body Talk series, Body Talk Pt. 1 and Body Talk Pt. 2, were released in June and September 2010.

While being a separate studio album in its own right, the full-length release also serves as a compilation album, containing the "best songs" from the first two entries in the Body Talk series in addition to five new songs. In certain territories, the new songs were also available separately as an extended play released the same day, titled Body Talk Pt. 3. The four songs and two acoustic versions from the project that were excluded from the original track listing were later included on the German iTunes and 2019 Record Store Day vinyl versions of the album.

In October 2019, the album was placed at number eight on Pitchfork's list of "The 200 Best Albums of the 2010s". In 2020, the album was ranked 196 on Rolling Stone's list of 500 greatest albums of all time. In 2024, the album was ranked 100 on Apple Music's 100 Best Albums of All Time list. As of 2013, combined sales of the three parts of Body Talk series were 170,000 copies in the United States.

== Background and development ==
"[...] It was never my goal to break some kind of a world record in how many songs I could release in a year. Although I think it would count as a pretty good attempt, it's been about the process for me. It's been very interesting to try and figure out a more organic way of making music. A way that is unbiased and has its starting point in what feels logical to me, but also to the listeners.

Even though it was never a conceptual idea, but a practical solution to the problem of getting bored with just doing one thing at a time, it has influenced not only the music, but all the visual content for the album as well. And the way I've communicated with press and listeners. [...]"

— Robyn, explaining the concept of the Body Talk series

In an interview with Swedish magazine Bon, Robyn announced that she had plans to release three new albums in 2010. She said, "I got all these great songs so why not? [...] It's been 5 years since Robyn and I didn't want to wait with a release until they are all recorded, so I decided to start putting them out right away." Robyn told Popjustice journalist Peter Robinson, "It's been a long time since I actually made a record! And I was thinking of how to shorten that time down and Eric, my manager, came up with the idea of what if I just start releasing songs, then I can tour them, then I can make some more songs. We started working like that. I think once it starts it will make more sense – you can just keep releasing stuff without the long breaks."

Robyn collaborated with Swedish producer Max Martin on the song "Time Machine". Martin was responsible for producing Robyn's US breakthrough hits "Do You Know (What It Takes)" and "Show Me Love", which both charted inside the top 10 of the US Billboard Hot 100 in 1996 and 1997. She said of the collaboration: "It was nostalgic to go back into the studio together. For me, it's perfect timing – I've come full circle. It's a way for me to show that I'm not trying to distance myself from where I come from. It's still all about the songs."

== Release and promotion ==
On 20 October 2010, Robyn announced the details of Body Talk on her website, along with the track listing and artwork. She described the album as the "turbo version of the Body Talk album", as it includes five songs from each previous Body Talk album along with five new songs.

=== Singles ===
Robyn announced the release of the single, "Indestructible", on 13 October 2010. An acoustic version appeared on her previous album, Body Talk Pt. 2. The song was released on 1 November 2010 in Scandinavia and one day later in the United States. It is co-written by Klas Åhlund, and has been described as a "pulsating full power version [that] takes every ounce of that emotion and wraps it up in another exceptional disco-pop record worthy of any dance-floor or passion-laden sing-a-long." The second single, "Call Your Girlfriend", was released on 1 April 2011.

== Critical reception ==
Professional ratings
Aggregate scores
Source	Rating
AnyDecentMusic?	8.1/10
Metacritic	86/100
Review scores
Source	Rating
AllMusic	5/5 stars
The A.V. Club	A
Entertainment Weekly	A
Evening Standard	4/5 stars
Financial Times	4/5 stars
The Guardian	4/5 stars
MSN Music (Expert Witness)	A−
Pitchfork	8.7/10
Rolling Stone	4/5 stars
Slant Magazine	4/5 stars

Body Talk received widespread acclaim from most music critics. According to the review aggregator Metacritic, Body Talk received "universal acclaim" based on a weighted average score of 86 out of 100 from 19 critic scores.

Music critic Jonathan Keefe from Slant Magazine said the album is "a testament to Robyn's truly forward-thinking take on contemporary pop music and to her rare ability to infuse chilly, futuristic soundscapes with genuine emotion and soul." Keefe also said that Body Talk "impresses for its thematic focus and laser-precise editing" and that the album is "one of the year's finest, most progressive pop albums". The A.V. Club also felt that the album is "hands-down the best dance-pop album of the year," and praised it as "euphoric, personal, and inspirational to the last beat", saying that it "proves there's still room for smart, mature songwriting and heartfelt performance in the high-gloss world of club music," and noting the presence of "real emotion (...) among the ones and zeros of electronic music."

Entertainment Weekly said that "Spectacular Swedish import Robyn continues to languish in the cult-act remainder bin, but these 15 excellently curated tracks deserve to change that." Pitchfork stamped it with its "Best New Music" label. Rolling Stone said it was "the best dance-pop album of 2010", with every song being "both immaculately catchy and packed with quirks". MusicOMH said that Body Talk "shows just how easily [Robyn] can churn out hits more frequently than labels can process production teams." AllMusic music critic Heather Phares said that "Releasing that much new music within six months was a feat in and of itself, but the fact that each part of Body Talk was so consistent made the whole project even more impressive." Phares said that the album's appeal "isn't just experimental: by picking the best of the project's songs, it feels like a greatest-hits collection and brand new album rolled into one."

=== Accolades ===
Publication	Rank
The A.V. Club	10
Billboard	3
Cokemachineglow	26
Drowned in Sound	60
Entertainment Weekly	3
MTV	3
MusicOMH	3
Pitchfork	15
Popjustice	2
PopMatters	69 (for Body Talk Pt. 1)
Rolling Stone	14
Slant Magazine	2
Spin	10 (for Body Talk Pt. 1)

Body Talk was chosen the 2nd best album released in 2010 by Popjustice and Slant Magazine, the 3rd best album released in 2010 by Entertainment Weekly, MTV and Billboard, the 10th best album of 2010 by both The A.V. Club and Spin, and was also selected as the 14th best album of 2010, by Rolling Stone. Pitchfork listed Body Talk as the eighth best album of the 2010s. In 2020, Rolling Stone ranked the album number 196 in the reboot of their 500 Greatest Albums of All Time list. Apple Music included Body Talk as their 100th pick for their 100 Best Albums list made in 2024.

== Track listing ==
Standard edition
No.	Title	Lyrics	Music	Producer(s)	Length
1.	"Fembot"	Klas Åhlund; Robyn	K. Åhlund; Robyn	K. Åhlund	3:35
2.	"Don't Fucking Tell Me What to Do"	K. Åhlund; Robyn	K. Åhlund; Robyn	K. Åhlund	4:11
3.	"Dancing on My Own"	Robyn; Patrik Berger	Robyn; Berger	Berger; Robyn^{[a]}	4:49
4.	"Indestructible"	Robyn; K. Åhlund	Robyn; K. Åhlund	K. Åhlund	3:41
5.	"Time Machine"	Max Martin; Shellback; Sophia Somajo; Robyn; K. Åhlund	Martin; Shellback	Martin; Shellback	3:33
6.	"Love Kills"	Robyn; K. Åhlund	Robyn; K. Åhlund; Måns Glaeser; Carli Löf	K. Åhlund; Savage Skulls	4:32
7.	"Hang with Me"	K. Åhlund	K. Åhlund	K. Åhlund	4:21
8.	"Call Your Girlfriend"	K. Åhlund; Robyn	K. Åhlund; Robyn; Alexander Kronlund	K. Åhlund; Billboard^{[a]}	3:47
9.	"None of Dem" (featuring Röyksopp)	Robyn	Robyn; Svein Berge; Torbjørn Brundtland	Röyksopp	5:13
10.	"We Dance to the Beat"	Robyn; K. Åhlund	K. Åhlund	K. Åhlund	4:39
11.	"U Should Know Better" (featuring Snoop Dogg)	K. Åhlund; Dogg	K. Åhlund; Dogg	K. Åhlund; Niggaracci	4:01
12.	"Dancehall Queen"	K. Åhlund	K. Åhlund; Thomas Pentz	K. Åhlund; Diplo	3:39
13.	"Get Myself Together"	K. Åhlund; Robyn	K. Åhlund; Robyn; Kronlund	K. Åhlund; Billboard^{[a]}	3:41
14.	"In My Eyes"	Robyn; K. Åhlund	Robyn; Kleerup; K. Åhlund	Kleerup; Robyn^{[b]}	3:58
15.	"Stars 4-Ever"	K. Åhlund; Jocke Åhlund; Robyn	K. Åhlund; J. Åhlund	K. Åhlund; J. Åhlund; Billboard^{[a]}	4:00
Total length:					61:40

German iTunes Store deluxe edition (bonus content)
No.	Title	Lyrics	Music	Producer(s)	Length
16.	"Cry When You Get Older"	Robyn; K. Åhlund	Robyn; K. Åhlund	K. Åhlund	3:35
17.	"Hang with Me" (acoustic version)	K. Åhlund	K. Åhlund	K. Åhlund	3:21
18.	"Jag Vet En Dejlig Rosa"	Traditional	Traditional	K. Åhlund	2:11
19.	"Include Me Out"	Robyn; K. Åhlund	K. Åhlund; Kronlund	K. Åhlund	3:31
20.	"Criminal Intent"	K. Åhlund	K. Åhlund; Pentz	K. Åhlund; Diplo	3:43
21.	"Indestructible" (acoustic version)	Robyn; K. Åhlund	Robyn; K. Åhlund	K. Åhlund	4:14
22.	"Bad Gal" (Savage Skulls and Douster featuring Robyn)	Robyn	Glaeser; Löf; Hugo Passaquin	Savage Skulls; Douster	4:01
23.	"Dancing on My Own" (video)	Robyn; Berger	Robyn; Berger	Berger; Robyn^{[a]}	4:06
24.	"Hang with Me" (video)	K. Åhlund	K. Åhlund	K. Åhlund	3:34
25.	"Indestructible" (video)	K. Åhlund; Robyn	K. Åhlund; Robyn	K. Åhlund	3:36
26.	"Call Your Girlfriend" (video)	K. Åhlund; Robyn	K. Åhlund; Robyn; Kronlund	K. Åhlund; Billboard^{[a]}	3:34
Total length:					111:06

US and Canadian iTunes Store edition (bonus track)
No.	Title	Lyrics	Music	Producer(s)	Length
16.	"Dancehall Queen" (Diplo and Stenchman remix) (featuring Spoek Mathambo)	K. Åhlund	K. Åhlund; Pentz	K. Åhlund; Diplo	4:14
Total length:					66:04

Record Store Day 2019 vinyl reissue
No.	Title	Length
1.	"Fembot"	3:24
2.	"Don't Fucking Tell Me What To Do"	4:11
3.	"Indestructible"	3:41
4.	"Dancehall Queen"	3:39
5.	"Hang With Me"	4:21
6.	"Stars 4-Ever"	5:32
7.	"Dancing On My Own"	4:49
8.	"Criminal Intent"	3:43
9.	"Call Your Girlfriend"	3:47
10.	"U Should Know Better" (featuring Snoop Dogg)	4:01
11.	"Love Kills"	4:32
12.	"Cry When You Get Older"	3:35
13.	"Indestructible" (acoustic version)	4:01
14.	"Hang with Me" (acoustic version)	3:18
15.	"Jag Vet En Dejlig Rosa"	2:11
16.	"Stars 4-Ever" (acoustic version)	5:33

2026 Complete Body Talk vinyl reissue
No.	Title	Length
1.	"Don't Fucking Tell Me What To Do"	4:11
2.	"Fembot"	3:35
3.	"Dancing On My Own"	4:49
4.	"Cry When You Get Older"	3:35
5.	"Dancehall Queen"	3:39
6.	"None Of Dem" (featuring Röyksopp)	5:13
7.	"In My Eyes"	3:58
8.	"Include Me Out"	3:31
9.	"Hang With Me"	4:21
10.	"Hang With Me" (acoustic version)	3:21
11.	"Love Kills"	4:32
12.	"We Dance To The Beat"	4:39
13.	"Criminal Intent"	3:43
14.	"U Should Know Better" (featuring Snoop Dogg)	4:01
15.	"Indestructible"	3:41
16.	"Time Machine"	3:33
17.	"Call Your Girlfriend"	3:47
18.	"Get Myself Together"	3:41
19.	"Stars 4-Ever"	4:00
20.	"Indestructible" (acoustic version)	4:14
Total length:		64:18

=== Notes ===
- ^{^[a]} signifies a co-producer.
- ^{^[b]} signifies an additional producer.
- On the US and Canadian versions of the album, the radio version of "Dancing on My Own" is the opening track, with the rest of the songs following.

== Charts ==
=== Weekly charts ===
Chart (2010–2011)	Peak position
Australian Dance Albums (ARIA)	21
Belgian Albums (Ultratop Flanders)	32
Belgian Alternative Albums (Ultratop Flanders)	14
Danish Albums (Hitlisten)	13
Norwegian Albums (VG-lista)	8
Swedish Albums (Sverigetopplistan)	2
UK Albums (Official Charts)	168
US Billboard 200	142
US Top Dance Albums (Billboard)	3

=== Year-end charts ===
Chart (2010)	Position
Swedish Albums (Sverigetopplistan)	38

Chart (2011)	Position
Swedish Albums (Sverigetopplistan)	19
US Top Dance/Electronic Albums (Billboard)	17

== Certifications ==
Region	Certification	Certified units/sales
Denmark (IFPI Danmark)	Platinum	20,000^{‡}
^{‡} Sales+streaming figures based on certification alone.

== Release history ==
Region	Date	Format	Label	Ref(s)
Canada	22 November 2010	CD	Konichiwa; Cherrytree; Interscope	
United States	22 November 2010	CD; digital download	Konichiwa; Cherrytree; Interscope	
Scandinavia	24 November 2010	CD	Konichiwa; EMI	
United Kingdom	29 November 2010	CD; digital download	Island	
Japan	1 December 2010	Digital download	Universal	
Germany	3 December 2010	CD; digital download	Embassy of Music	
Poland	3 December 2010	CD	Universal	
Italy	7 December 2010	Digital download	Universal	
Scandinavia	8 December 2010	LP	Konichiwa; EMI	
Australia	10 December 2010	CD	Modular	
Spain	14 December 2010	Digital download	Universal	
Various	13 April 2019	LP (limited RSD edition)	Konichiwa	
Various	17 July 2026	LP (Complete Body Talk reissue)	Konichiwa	

== Body Talk Pt. 3 ==
Body Talk Pt. 3

EP by Robyn
- Released: 22 November 2010
- Length: 18:42
- Label: Konichiwa
- Producers: Jocke Åhlund; Klas Åhlund; Max Martin; Shellback

Robyn chronology
Body Talk (2010)	Body Talk Pt. 3 (2010)	Do It Again (2014)

Body Talk Pt. 3 is the third extended play (EP) by Swedish singer Robyn. It was released on 22 November 2010, simultaneously with Robyn's seventh studio album, Body Talk (2010). In November 2011, the EP garnered a Grammy Award nomination for Best Dance/Electronic Album, while the second single, "Call Your Girlfriend", received a nomination for Best Dance Recording.

=== Track listing ===
Body Talk Pt. 3
No.	Title	Lyrics	Music	Production	Length
1.	"Indestructible"	Robyn; K. Åhlund	Robyn; K. Åhlund	K. Åhlund	3:41
2.	"Time Machine"	Martin; Shellback; Somajo; Robyn; K. Åhlund	Martin; Shellback	Martin; Shellback	3:33
3.	"Call Your Girlfriend"	K. Åhlund; Robyn	K. Åhlund; Robyn; Kronlund	K. Åhlund; Billboard^{[a]}	3:47
4.	"Get Myself Together"	K. Åhlund; Robyn	K. Åhlund; Robyn; Kronlund	K. Åhlund; Billboard^{[a]}	3:41
5.	"Stars 4-Ever"	K. Åhlund; J. Åhlund; Robyn	K. Åhlund; J. Åhlund	K. Åhlund; J. Åhlund; Billboard^{[a]}	4:00
Total length:					18:42

==== Notes ====
- ^{^[a]} signifies a co-producer

=== Charts ===
Chart (2010)	Peak position
Danish Albums (Hitlisten)	27
UK Dance Albums (Official Charts)	11
US Top Dance Albums (Billboard)	7

=== Release history ===
Region	Date	Format	Label	Ref.
United States	22 November 2010	Digital download	Konichiwa; Cherrytree; Interscope	
Denmark	24 November 2010	CD	Parlophone	
Sweden	24 November 2010	CD	Parlophone	
Germany	3 November 2010	CD; digital download	Embassy of Music	
