= Caron Bowman =

Afro Honduran American painter

Caron Bowman is an American artist, born in West Palm Beach, Florida, to parents from Roatan, Honduras. She works within a diverse spectrum of mediums including drawing, fibre art, painting, public art, and multimedia. Influences seen throughout her artwork include graffiti art, hard-edge painting, and surrealism.

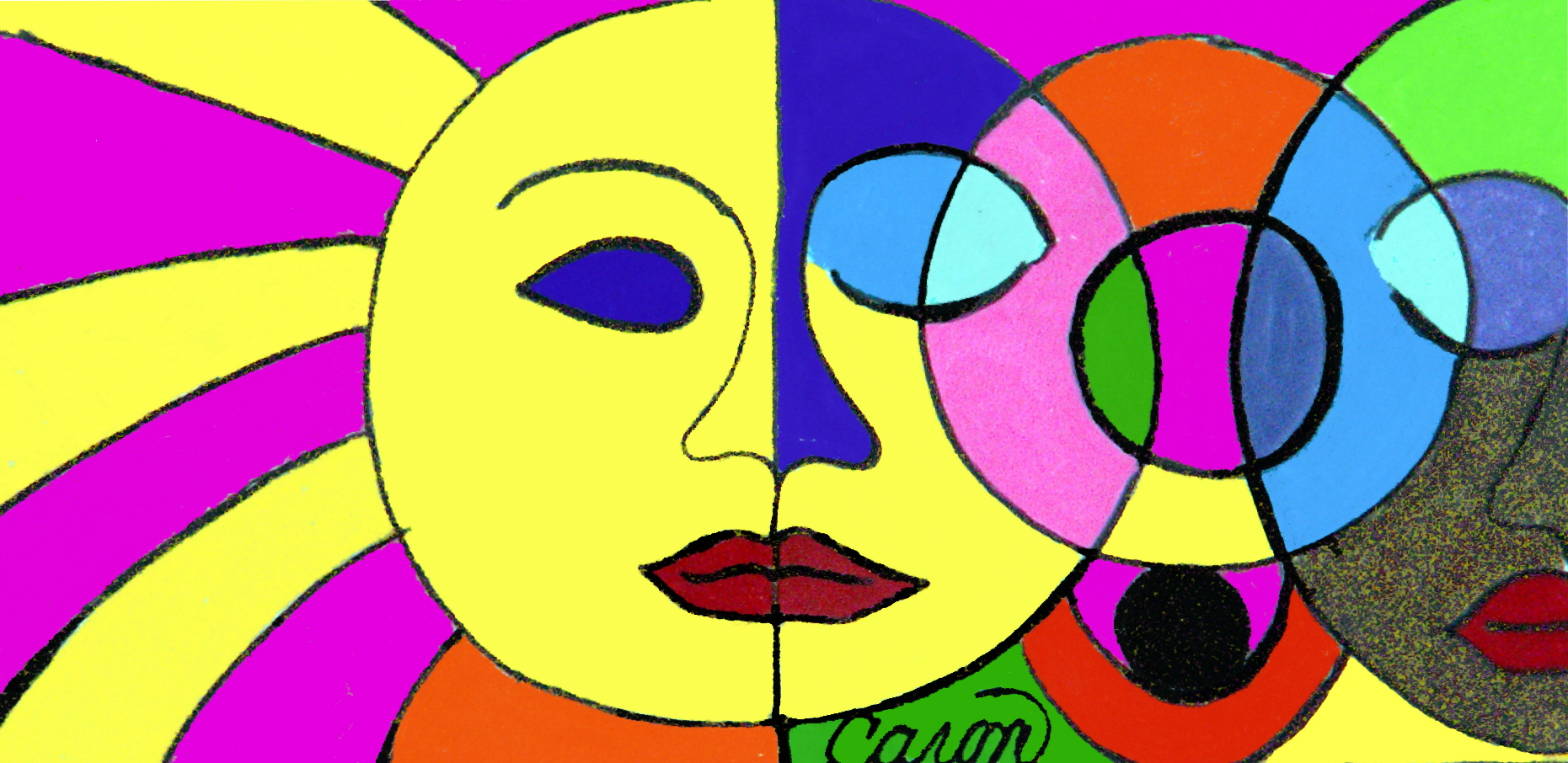
Sunshine and Moon Caron Bowman

== Description ==
Caron Bowman is a multi-disciplined artist, arts activist, curator and historian. Her work spans various techniques including drawing, fibre art, painting, and installations. As a BIPOC public art consultant, she has created art in public places programming for the City of West Palm Beach Downtown Development Authority. Bowman is a director of Street Art Revolution, a public art collective and design firm specializing in providing public art, civic design, and sculpture. Bowman has a Bachelor of Arts degree in History and a Master of Arts degree in Exceptional Student Education. Utilizing a Florida aesthetic as a source of inspiration, her artwork is about the intensity of color, curved lines, and daring patterns unified into one language. She utilized automatic drawing techniques in order to develop her style. In 2013, Caron Bowman was a featured artist in the Wynwood Miami Mix Art Fair.

Bowman was selected by the Bombay Sapphire Corporation to be included in the Bombay Sapphire Artisan Series. The series is a showcase for emerging artists in the United States.

Bowman's artwork has been profiled by the Chagall Museum and the Hiroshima Museum of Art. In 2014, Bowman was also selected as a finalist for the Smithsonian American Latino Museum Campaign. The Beck's corporation selected Bowman as a semi-finalist for the Beck's Green Box augmented reality series.

Rapper Kendrick Lamar, in association with Creative Allies, showcased Bowman's artwork in New York City at the Galapagos Art Space in 2011. Bowman has been profiled in publications including The American Latino Museum, The 2012 and 2013 Los Angeles African American Heritage Guide, Tom Joyner Foundation, and Nick Knight's – SHOWstudio.
