= Cardiac arrest (disambiguation) =

Cardiac arrest is a condition in which the heart stops beating.

Cardiac Arrest may also refer to:

- Cardiac Arrest (film), a 1980 film
- Cardiac Arrest (TV series), BBC television drama about the British NHS in the 1990s
- "Cardiac Arrest" (The Detectives), a 1997 television episode
- Cardiac Arrest, the first name of English band Cardiacs
- Cardiac Arrest (album), the 1977 debut album by American band Cameo
- "Cardiac Arrest" (Madness song), 1981
- "Cardiac Arrest" (Teddybears song), 2011
- "Cardiac Arrest", a 2013 single by Bad Suns that was included on the album Language & Perspective
- "Cardiac Arrest", a song from the album Ample Destruction by Jag Panzer, 1984

== See also ==
- Cardiac
- Arrest
