= Body Talk Pt. 2 =

Studio album (mini-album) by Robyn
- Released: 6 September 2010
- Recorded: 2010
- Studios: Kleerup's flat (Note: Track 1); Svenska Grammofonstudion (Gothenburg); Apmamman (Stockholm) (Note: Tracks 1–7); Shortlist (Stockholm); Östberga (Note: Track 4); The Record Plant (Los Angeles) (Note: Track 7); Cosmos (Stockholm) (Note: Track 8)
- Genres: Synth-pop; dance-pop
- Length: 32:58
- Label: Konichiwa
- Producers: Klas Åhlund; Diplo; Kleerup; Niggaracci (Note: Niggaracci is a pseudonym for Snoop Dogg.); Savage Skulls

Robyn chronology
Body Talk Pt. 1 (2010)	Body Talk Pt. 2 (2010)	Body Talk (2010)

Singles from Body Talk Pt. 2
- 1. "Hang with Me" Released: 16 August 2010

Body Talk Pt. 2 is the sixth studio album (fourth internationally released) by Swedish singer Robyn, released on 6 September 2010 by Konichiwa Records. The album is the second part of the Body Talk trilogy, which consists of three mini-albums, all released during 2010. Robyn started working on songs for the album when Body Talk Pt. 1 (2010) was still in development, and she collaborated with Klas Åhlund, Kleerup, Savage Skulls, Diplo and Snoop Dogg. Musically, the songs on Body Talk Pt. 2 are upbeat and a mixture between electro, house, hip-hop and disco.

Critical reception of the album was generally positive. Although critics felt that it lacked a classic single and considered it a minor letdown compared to Body Talk Pt. 1, it received praise for being solid and club-ready. In Sweden, the album reached the top of the Sverigetopplistan chart. It also reached number one in Denmark and number three in Norway. In the United States, it peaked at number 41, becoming Robyn's highest position on the chart.

"Hang with Me" was released as the album's only single in August 2010. An acoustic version of the song was featured on Body Talk Pt. 1. The single reached the top ten in Sweden and Norway. The last track on the album, "Indestructible", appears in acoustic form and was later remixed and served as the lead single for Body Talk, the final installment in the trilogy.

== Background and development ==
"It's been a long time since I actually made a record! And I was thinking of how to shorten that time down and Eric, my manager, came up with the idea of what if I just start releasing songs, then I can tour them, then I can make some more songs. We started working like that. I think once it starts it will make more sense – you can just keep releasing stuff without the long breaks."

— Robyn on the Body Talk trilogy

In February 2010, Robyn announced in an interview with Swedish magazine Bon that she would release three albums during 2010. She noted that it had been five years since she released her last effort, Robyn (2005), and that she had not been in the studio "properly" since then. She explained that she did not want to wait until all the songs had been recorded; she rather wanted to split up the songs in three different releases. She chose to name the trilogy Body Talk after a gay club in London that a friend of hers owns, commenting that the title "tickles [her] imagination". In June 2010, the first in the trilogy, Body Talk Pt. 1, was released, and was quickly followed by the announcement of Body Talk Pt. 2. The album's lead single, "Hang with Me" and the track "Indestructible", were among the first songs to be recorded for the trilogy. Robyn said that "we saved them for later because I knew they would be singles, or could be singles, and I wanted them to get that chance." "Hang with Me" was originally recorded in 2002 by Klas Åhlund's then-wife, Paola Bruna, for her album Stockcity Girl.

The songs on the album were written at the same time as the songs on Body Talk Pt. 1. In mid-July 2010, Billboard reported that the mixing of the songs had been completed. Robyn worked primary with Swedish producer and songwriter Klas Åhlund, who was heavily involved in the production of Body Talk Pt. 1. Unlike the first installment, Body Talk Pt. 2 saw Robyn working with a few producers apart from Åhlund, such as Diplo, Kleerup, and electronic duo Savage Skulls. She also worked with American rapper Snoop Dogg on the song "U Should Know Better". The two originally met when Robyn was asked to sing vocals on a remix of his single "Sexual Eruption" (2007). Six months later, they met up once again to write and record "U Should Know Better." While being interviewed by Billboard, Robyn spoke of the experience of working with the rapper, stating, "It was really cool to be able to be in the studio with him, first because I always was a fan but also because he was really creative and we had so much of an exchange in being there together, both as vocalists. I had an idea and he really got it and got into it, which was awesome." She also worked with Savage Skulls on two songs on the album; "Love Kills" and the iTunes exclusive "Bad Gal". Robyn spoke of the duo, saying that "these really young guys who are part of a scene that I probably would've gotten into if I wasn't away so much when I was younger."

== Composition ==
"Hang with Me"
"Hang with Me" features a club beat, energetic bass and synth arpeggios.

"U Should Know Better"
"U Should Know Better" features Robyn and rapper Snoop Dogg swapping lines over an electro beat.

According to Tom Ewing of The Guardian, Body Talk Pt. 2 is "faster, harder, [and] clubbier" than its predecessor. The writer described it as "the Body Talk for people who like their Robyn upbeat, fierce and dancefloor-ready." Adam Johns of Drowned in Sound stated that the album marks a departure from Robyn's "formula of 'creative' tracks sprinkled through with low-key pop gems." He recalled her previous work as "high-tech" and said that the songs on Body Talk Pt. 2 are "sprinkled with italo-sounding synths, arpreggios and minor-key arrangements." Joe Colly of Pitchfork noted that Robyn "primarily sticks with the quick-moving, clubby synth-pop that is her calling card." Jaime Gill of BBC Music noted its "beats-driven approach" and the mix between electro, house, hip-hop, classic disco and "orchestral, tear-teasing balladry."

The opening track, "In My Eyes", utilizes tingling synthesizers. Colly said that Robyn is "an encouraging den mother" on the song, singing "Little star, I got you. You'll be okay." Luke O'Neill of The Boston Globe said that the song showcases "the tension-and-catharsis approach Robyn is capable of achieving with her vocals." The second track, "Include Me Out" was referred to as "digitised stop-start funk". The song begins with the line, "It is really very simple, just a single pulse repeated at a regular interval", which according to O'Neill described "the main sonic trick employed on a lot of her dance-ready songs." On the song, Robyn plays a party-starter that is "repping matriarchs and cross-dressers alike" with the line "This one's for the granny, take a bow... Come on all you trannies, click your heels for me." "Hang with Me", carries a "fierce, club-wrecking beat", with "relentlessly energetic bass" and synth arpeggios. Lyrically, the song speaks of trust in a relationship, with lines such as "Just don't fall recklessly, headlessly in love with me." Fraser McAlpine of BBC Music said that the song views "the perspective of someone who's a bit too tightly buttoned-up to let her defences down." The fourth track, "Love Kills" was described as a "discofied, sharp-edged" song, with fierce vocals and "haunting Pet Shop Boys flourishes." "We Dance to the Beat" is a techno song, with an "apocalyptic, big-beat". It features a "sort of spoken-word hype-up jam" that was compared to "Don't Fucking Tell Me What to Do". The song features lines such as "We dance to the beat of your brains not evolving fast enough" and "We dance to the beat of bad kissers clicking teeth."

The sixth track, "Criminal Intent", features Robyn rapping, which was compared to the rapping style of musician Peaches. The song is about Robyn getting arrested for "freaky dancing" to her own song. Ben Norman of About.com called it "a darker version of [Robyn's] previous rap songs". Comparisons were also drawn towards "Fembot" from Body Talk Pt. 1, and "Piece of Me" by Britney Spears. "U Should Know Better" featuring Snoop Dogg was called the album's highlight by several critics. It features Snoop Dogg rapping over an electro beat and Robyn delivering "quotable, ridiculous lines", such as "You know when in Rome I sat down with the Romans. Said we need a black Pope and she'd better be a woman." Jaime Gill of BBC Music said that the song features "the teen-pop singer and hip hop outlaw swapping louche quips over a relentless, grimy electro stomp." The acoustic "Indestructible" reflects "the downside of needing someone". Norman said that it "is sweeping and symphonic and has so much vulnerability and strength in it that you believe she really will love as if she is indestructible."

== Singles ==
"Hang with Me" was released as the first and only single from the album. An acoustic version of the song was previously featured on the preceding album, Body Talk Pt. 1. The song was met with positive reviews from critics, who compared it to her previous singles, "With Every Heartbeat", "Be Mine!" and "Dancing on My Own". The song reached number two in Sweden and number seven in Norway. The accompanying music video shows scenes of Robyn's everyday life and was shot over a two-week period in London.

Following the release of the album, the tracks "Love Kills", "In My Eyes" and the acoustic version of "Indestructible" charted in Sweden at numbers 35, 51 and 54, respectively. "Indestructible" was later remixed and released as the lead single for Body Talk. Despite not being released as a single, a music video for the iTunes exclusive "Bad Gal", featuring Savage Skulls and Douster, premiered in January 2011. The video was directed by Tim Erem.

== Critical reception ==
Professional ratings
Aggregate scores
Source	Rating
Metacritic	76/100
Review scores
Source	Rating
AllMusic	4/5 stars
The A.V. Club	A−
BBC Music	favourable
The Boston Globe	favourable
Entertainment Weekly	A
The Guardian	4/5 stars
NME	8/10
Pitchfork	8/10
Rolling Stone	3.5/5 stars
Slant Magazine	3.5/5 stars

Body Talk Pt. 2 received mostly positive reviews from music critics. At Metacritic, which assigns a normalised rating out of 100 to reviews from mainstream critics, the album received an average score of 76, based on 23 reviews, which indicates "generally favorable reviews". Jaime Gill of BBC Music called the album a "brief, brilliant record that leaves you panting, Body Talk, Part 2 is the latest evidence that Robyn is probably the best, most versatile pop star currently at work." Sal Cinquemani of Slant Magazine referred to the album as "pretty fucking fantastic", despite stating that it was "a minor letdown following the near-perfection of its predecessor". Tom Ewing of The Guardian said that "the second episode [in the trilogy] has a different flavour from the first." Ewing named "U Should Know Better" the best song on the record, calling it the "unlikeliest success". In contrast, he considered "Criminal Intent" the worst song, but said that "even that has a lovely, draggy vibe." Dan Martin of NME wrote that the album "doesn't quite end with a severed hand, but it does swing a little lower with an awesomeness that tries less hard to be liked straight away."

Jody Rosen of Rolling Stone wrote that the album "offers up another batch of great, club-ready songs that are a touch too weird for American hit radio. Robyn sings and raps about standard diva themes (dance-floor ecstasy, self-reliance), but the music is deliciously wacked-out." Pitchfork's Joe Colly felt the album needed a "classic single on par with 'Dancing on My Own' or '[With Every] Heartbeat'", but concluded, "Minor quibbles and missteps aside, Body Talk Pt. 2 is a perfectly solid—and occasionally awesome—record." Heather Phares of AllMusic wrote that through the album, Robyn proves "that stylish, cutting-edge pop doesn't have to be competitive or egotistical." Adam Johns of Drowned in Sound was mixed in his review, writing that "While it's a fairly remarkable piece of craft, her icy disco diversion here leaves me somewhat flat [...] It should satisfy the listeners who primarily show up for Creative Robyn." Luke Winkie of musicOMH wrote a mixed review as well, saying that "Pt 2 doesn't have the same feel [as Pt 1]; it's as if Robyn may have exhausted her supply of great songs too soon. It has its moments, but in general just doesn't compare to Pt 1."

== Commercial performance ==
Body Talk Pt. 2 debuted at number one on the Sverigetopplistan albums chart on the issue dated 17 September 2010, two positions higher than its predecessor's debut. In Denmark, it debuted atop the chart, with sales of 2,500 units, of which digital sales accounted for 68%. On the US Billboard 200 chart, the album debuted at number forty-one on the issue dated 25 September 2010, selling 8,000 copies in its first week. It also debuted on the Dance/Electronic Albums chart at number two, behind Lady Gaga's The Fame. In its second week on the Billboard 200 chart, the album fell to number 200, making it Robyn's first release since Robyn Is Here (1995) to spend more than one week on the chart. On the issue dated 25 September 2010, the album debuted at number thirty-eight on the UK Albums Chart, selling 3,602 copies. In Norway, the album debuted at number three and spent seven weeks on the chart. The album also reached the top 50 in Austria, Belgium (Flanders), Finland, Germany and Ireland.

== Track listing ==
No.	Title	Lyrics	Music	Producer(s)	Length
1.	"In My Eyes"	Robyn; Klas Åhlund	Robyn; Kleerup; Åhlund	Kleerup; Robyn^{[a]}	4:08
2.	"Include Me Out"	Robyn; Åhlund	Åhlund; Alex Kronlund	Åhlund	3:31
3.	"Hang with Me"	Åhlund	Åhlund	Åhlund	4:21
4.	"Love Kills"	Robyn; Åhlund	Robyn; Åhlund; Måns Glaeser; Carli Löf	Åhlund; Savage Skulls	4:32
5.	"We Dance to the Beat"	Robyn; Åhlund	Åhlund	Åhlund	4:39
6.	"Criminal Intent"	Åhlund	Åhlund; Thomas Pentz	Åhlund; Diplo	3:43
7.	"U Should Know Better" (featuring Snoop Dogg)	Åhlund; Snoop Dogg	Åhlund; Snoop Dogg	Åhlund; Niggaracci	4:01
8.	"Indestructible" (acoustic version)	Robyn; Åhlund	Robyn; Åhlund	Åhlund	4:14

iTunes Store bonus track
No.	Title	Writer(s)	Producer(s)	Length
9.	"Bad Gal" (with Savage Skulls and Douster)	Robyn; Måns Glaeser; Carli Löf; Hugo Passaquin	Savage Skulls; Douster	4:01

=== Notes ===
- ^{^[a]} signifies an additional producer

== Personnel ==
Credits adapted from the liner notes of Body Talk Pt. 2.

=== Musicians ===
- Robyn – vocals
- Kleerup – all instruments, programming (track 1)
- Carl Bagge – string arrangements (tracks 1, 8)
- Martin Schaub – string conducting (track 1)
- Elin Stjärna – strings (track 1)
- Catherine Claesson – strings (track 1)
- Henrik Edström – strings (track 1)
- Mats Lindberg – strings (track 1)
- Klas Åhlund – instruments (tracks 2, 3, 5); programming (tracks 2–7)
- Savage Skulls – programming (track 4)
- Snoop Dogg – vocals (track 7)
- Erik Arvinder – strings (track 8)
- Christian Svarfvar – strings (track 8)
- Patrik Swedrup – strings (track 8)
- Daniel Migdal – strings (track 8)
- Pelle Hansen – strings (track 8)
- Erik Wahlgren – strings (track 8)

=== Technical ===
- Kleerup – production (track 1)
- Robyn – additional production (track 1)
- Henrik Gustafsson – engineering (track 1)
- Niklas Flyckt – mixing (tracks 1–7)
- Klas Åhlund – production (tracks 2–8); vocal production, vocal recording (tracks 4, 6); mixing (track 8)
- Savage Skulls – production (track 4)
- Diplo – production (track 6)
- Niggaracci – production (track 7)
- Tom Coyne – mastering at Sterling Sound (New York City)

=== Artwork ===
- Mary Fagot – creative direction
- Lucy McRae – art direction, body architect
- Johan Renck – photography
- Sandberg&Timonen – typography

== Charts ==
=== Weekly charts ===
Chart (2010)	Peak position
Australian Albums (ARIA)	68
Austrian Albums (Ö3 Austria)	50
Belgian Albums (Ultratop Flanders)	37
Belgian Albums (Ultratop Wallonia)	96
Canadian Albums (Billboard)	34
Danish Albums (Hitlisten)	1
European Albums (Billboard)	21
Finnish Albums (Suomen virallinen lista)	43
German Albums (Offizielle Top 100)	47
Irish Albums (IRMA)	41
Norwegian Albums (VG-lista)	3
Scottish Albums (Official Charts)	54
Swedish Albums (Sverigetopplistan)	1
Swiss Albums (Schweizer Hitparade)	91
UK Albums (Official Charts)	38
US Billboard 200	41
US Top Dance Albums (Billboard)	2

=== Year-end charts ===
Chart (2010)	Position
Swedish Albums (Sverigetopplistan)	20

== Release history ==
Region	Date	Format	Label	Ref.
Scandinavia	6 September 2010	CD; digital download	Konichiwa	
United States	7 September 2010	CD; digital download	Konichiwa; Cherrytree; Interscope	
Germany	10 September 2010	CD; digital download	Ministry of Sound	
United Kingdom	13 September 2010	CD; digital download	Konichiwa; Island	
Australia	24 September 2010	CD; digital download	Modular	
