= Call Your Girlfriend =

Single by Robyn

from the album Body Talk
- Released: 1 April 2011
- Recorded: Apmamman Studios (Stockholm, Sweden)
- Genre: Electropop; synth-pop
- Length: 3:46
- Label: Konichiwa
- Songwriters: Robyn; Alexander Kronlund; Klas Åhlund
- Producers: Klas Åhlund; Billboard; Jayce Lewis

Robyn singles chronology
"Cardiac Arrest" (2011)	"Call Your Girlfriend" (2011)	"Never Will Be Mine" (2011)

Music video
- "Call Your Girlfriend" on YouTube

"Call Your Girlfriend" is a song by Swedish singer Robyn, taken from her seventh studio album, Body Talk (2010). It was released as the album's second single on 1 April 2011. The song was written by Robyn, Klas Åhlund and Alexander Kronlund. Åhlund handled production, with assistance by Billboard. In the song, Robyn portrays a woman who begs her new partner to break up with an old girlfriend, and advises on how to do it gently. "Call Your Girlfriend" is an electropop ballad with synths and a buzzing rhythm.

The song received positive reviews from critics, who praised it for its lyrics and heartfelt message. The song reached number forty-three on the Sverigetopplistan chart, number eight on the Flanders Ultratip chart and number one in the Pmachinery Top 30. In the United States, it reached number one on Hot Dance Club Songs, becoming Robyn's highest-peaking song on the chart. The accompanying music video was released on 2 June 2011 and features Robyn dancing alone in a warehouse. The song has been performed on the NewNowNext Awards, Jimmy Kimmel Live!, RuPaul's Drag Race, and Saturday Night Live. The song was nominated for the Grammy Award for Best Dance Recording at the 2012 Grammy Awards.

== Background and composition ==
"Call Your Girlfriend"
"Call Your Girlfriend" is an electropop ballad, described as "soaringly tuneful".

In an interview with Teen.com, Robyn said that love and life inspired her to write the song. In January 2011, Robyn confirmed that it would be released as the second single from Body Talk, and that a music video for the song was in the works. Originally intended for a 16 May 2011 release, the single was released digitally on 1 April 2011, in Finland, and three days later in Sweden.

"Call Your Girlfriend" was written by Robyn, Alexander Kronlund and Klas Åhlund, with the latter producing the song. Billboard is credited as the co-producer. The song is an electropop and synth-pop ballad, described as "soaringly tuneful" and "cold-blooded". In the song, Robyn portrays a woman who is enjoying her new partner, but is concerned how this person's current girlfriend will be hurt by it. As a solution, she begs her partner to break up with the girlfriend and gives tips on how to do it gently. According to Scott Plagenhoef of Pitchfork, the song carries a "buzzing rhythm", synths and "a killer chord change." Plagenhoef wrote that Robyn "[is] as graceful about this role as when she plays the other points in the love triangle." He described it as "one of the most adult, thoughtful pop music breakups since the Field Mice's "Willow", but naturally without the twee-pop OGs' sense of melancholy."

== Reception ==
=== Critical reception ===
Ben Norman of About.com called the song "pensive pop" and said that it "demands [that] you sing along from the very beginning." He noted that the lyrics focuses on "the little bit of bad one must do to embrace the good". Marc Hogan of Pitchfork called it "one of Body Talk's most inspired moments". Genevieve Koski of The A.V. Club wrote that Body Talk "reaches its apex at its midpoint with 'Call Your Girlfriend,' which turns the breakup-anthem conceit on its ear in a manner that makes getting dumped seem inspiring." Heather Phares of Allmusic called it a "thoughtful twist on a love triangle that finds Robyn enjoying new love while being concerned for someone hurt by it." Evan Sawdey of PopMatters called it "remarkable" and "one of those rare Robyn tracks that finds a way to use its overtly commercial pop framework to tell a rather emotional, pointed relationship tale that is heads-and-shoulders above most of what’s on mainstream radio today."

"Call Your Girlfriend" received its first play on BBC Radio 1 on July 4, 2011, as Scott Mills' Record of the Week. It was released in the UK on August 1. On November 30, 2011, the song was nominated for the Grammy Award for Best Dance Recording for the 54th Grammy Awards.

=== Chart performance ===
"Call Your Girlfriend" debuted at number forty-three on the Sverigetopplistan chart in Sweden, on the issue dated 22 April 2011. On the issue dated July 2, 2011, the track peaked at #1 on the Billboard Hot Dance Club Play chart, thus became her first single to reach the top spot of Hot Dance Club Play Chart, and also her highest peaking and most successful single there. On the issue on 18 July 2011, the song debuted at number thirty-nine in New Zealand, Robyn's fourth single in that country. It peaked at number seventeen on the issue date 15 August 2011, becoming Robyn's highest single in the country since "Show Me Love".

== Music video ==
The music video for "Call Your Girlfriend" was directed by Max Vitali. It premiered on 2 June 2011, and features Robyn dancing alone in a soundstage. The video was choreographed by Maria "Decida" Wahlberg. Robyn confirmed a video for the song alongside the single announcement in January 2011. Tom Breihan of Pitchfork wrote that the video "is one long unbroken tracking shot of the Swedish pop queen dancing, singing, and looking like her heart is about to break. The only thing she has to keep her company is an elaborate lighting rig. It's a true command performance, a hall-of-fame effort from an artist at the absolute peak of her powers." Tamar Anitai of MTV Buzzworthy said that "[the clip] appears to be shot, incredibly, all in one take". The writer said that has a "stripped-down approach". Anitai also wrote, "In a stark, gorgeously lit gymnasium, Robyn approaches the gym-floor-turned-dance-floor with the focus of a seasoned gymnast approaching the mat before an Olympic floor routine." Jon Blistein of Billboard magazine also gave a positive review naming Robyn a "true pop star" and referring to the video as "so simple, yet nearly impossible to look away."

== Live performances ==
Robyn performed "Call Your Girlfriend" on the 2011 NewNowNext Awards. On 13 April 2011, she performed the song alongside "Dancing on My Own" on Jimmy Kimmel Live!, wearing a pastel blue top and matching lipstick. Robyn performed "Call Your Girlfriend" as well as fellow Body Talk single "Dancing On My Own" on the December 10th, 2011 episode of Saturday Night Live.

== Covers ==
French Canadian singer Marie-Mai released a French version of the song titled "Sans cri ni haine" (No shouts nor hate) as a promotional single for her fourth studio album Miroir. The song peaked at number one in Quebec for 7 weeks and was released in France as well. In October 2012, the song was awarded with the Felix Award, Quebec's most important awards for the popular song of the year.

Singer-songwriter Star Anna has performed the song live, most notably on KEXP.

A 2011 viral video features Saturday Night Live actor Taran Killam dancing to the song with the almost exact repetition of the same dance moves as Robyn.

In October 2011, the Swedish group Erato covered the song in an a cappella version using hand claps and empty butter tubs as rhythmic accompaniment in a viral YouTube video.

The video, itself, was later covered by young sisters Lennon and Maisy Stella. Suede guitarist Richard Oakes covered the song with his project Artmagic as the b-side to their single "Down In The River" in October 2012.

In November 2012, Newspaper Editor and Blogger, Harrison Mooney, created a parody, titled "Call the Union," in response to the 2012 NHL Lockout.

Minneapolis Band The New Standards released a cover version titled "Call Your Boyfriend" on their 2012 album Sunday Morning Coming Down and frequently performs the song live.

British singer, Cher Lloyd, performed an acoustic cover of the song in February 2013.

In May 2013, Michelle Chamuel performed the song on the fourth season of The Voice during the top 12 week.

Singer-songwriter Lucy Wainwright Roche (daughter of Loudon Wainwright III and Suzzy Roche) released an acoustic version.

Singer-songwriter John-Allison Weiss included an acoustic cover version on their 2014 EP Remember when.

Maya Rudolph and Emma Stone covered the song with "the Cups Song rhythm" on the sixth episode of NBC's Maya & Marty; 07/12/16.

In the 2016 video artwork To Me You Mean The Most by Adam Castle & Ed Twaddle, one of the artists sings along to the song. The artwork was featured in the 2017 Bloomberg New Contemporaries exhibition.

On 17 October 2018, Jade Bird debuted her cover of this song live on BBC Radio 1, playing the piano live with a string section.

In 2019, the song was covered in the episode "Chapter Fifty: American Dreams" from the third season of the television series Riverdale, performed by Camila Mendes and Vanessa Morgan.

Released in Canada in 2019, the final episode of the 4-season Dino Dana series (S4.E13, "The Sound of Dinosaurs") included a set of Dino-themed covers/parodies. The song "Age of Reptiles" reworks the lyrics of this song to be about dinosaurs.

== Track listing ==
- Digital download
1. "Call Your Girlfriend" – 3:47
2. "Call Your Girlfriend" (Sultan & Ned Shepard Remix Dub) – 5:36
3. "Call Your Girlfriend" (Feed Me Remix) – 4:55
- Germany CD single
1. "Call Your Girlfriend" (Radio Edit) – 3:31
2. "Call Your Girlfriend" (Kaskade Remix) – 5:38
- UK digital EP
1. "Call Your Girlfriend" – 3:47
2. "Call Your Girlfriend" (Feed Me Remix) – 4:55
3. "Call Your Girlfriend" (Kaskade Remix) – 5:38
4. "Call Your Girlfriend" (Sultan & Ned Remix) – 5:36
5. "Call Your Girlfriend" (Azari & III Remix) – 4:41
- US digital remix EP
1. "Call Your Girlfriend" (Feed Me Remix) – 4:55
2. "Call Your Girlfriend" (Kaskade Remix) – 5:38
3. "Call Your Girlfriend" (Sultan & Ned Remix) – 5:37
4. "Call Your Girlfriend" (Sultan & Ned Remix Dub) – 5:37
- AUS Remixes
1. "Call Your Girlfriend" (Edit) – 3:30
2. "Call Your Girlfriend" (Kaskade Remix) – 5:38
3. "Call Your Girlfriend" (Kaskade Edit) – 3:36
4. "Call Your Girlfriend" (Feed Me Remix) – 4:55
5. "Call Your Girlfriend" (Azari & III Remix) – 4:41
6. "Call Your Girlfriend" (Sultan & Ned Remix) – 5:36
7. "Call Your Girlfriend" (Sultan & Ned Remix Dub) – 5:37
8. "Call Your Girlfriend" (Sultan & Ned Remix Edit) – 3:53

== Credits and personnel ==
- Robyn – music and lyrics
- Alexander Kronlund – music
- Klas Åhlund – music, lyrics, production, instruments and programming
- Billboard – co-production, instruments and programming
- Niklas Flyckt – mixing
- Jayce Lewis - Synth Programming, Remix

== Charts ==
Chart (2011)	Peak position
Belgium (Ultratip Bubbling Under Flanders)	8
Belgium Dance Songs (Ultratip Flanders)	31
Denmark Airplay (Tracklisten)	18
New Zealand (Recorded Music NZ)	17
Sweden (Sverigetopplistan)	43
UK Singles (The Official Charts Company)	55
US Hot Dance Club Songs (Billboard)	1
US Hot Single Sales (Billboard)	6

=== Year-end charts ===
Chart (2011)	Position
US Hot Dance Club Songs (Billboard)	31

== Certifications ==
Region	Certification	Certified units/sales
United States (RIAA)	Gold	500,000^{‡}
^{‡} Sales+streaming figures based on certification alone.

== Release history ==
List of release dates, showing country, formats released, and record label
Country	Release date	Format(s)	Label
Finland	1 April 2011	Digital download	Konichiwa Records
Norway	4 April 2011	Digital download	Konichiwa Records
Sweden	4 April 2011	Digital download	Konichiwa Records
United States	10 May 2011	Digital remix EP	Interscope Records
United Kingdom	17 June 2011	Digital EP	Island Records
Germany	15 July 2011	CD single	Warner Music International
Australia	28 September 2012	Digital remixes	Konichiwa Records

== See also ==
- List of number-one dance singles of 2011 (U.S.)
