= Hang with Me =

Single by Robyn

from the album Body Talk Pt. 2
- Released: 16 August 2010
- Recorded: Apmamman Studios (Stockholm, Sweden)
- Genre: Electropop; Euro disco
- Length: 4:19
- Label: Konichiwa
- Songwriter: Klas Åhlund
- Producer: Klas Åhlund

Robyn singles chronology
"Dancing on My Own" (2010)	"Hang with Me" (2010)	"Indestructible" (2010)

Music video
- "Hang with Me" on YouTube

"Hang with Me" is a song by Swedish recording artist Robyn, taken from her sixth studio album, Body Talk Pt. 2 (2010). It was released as the album's lead single via digital download on 16 August 2010, in Sweden, and one day later in the United States. An acoustic version of the song had previously been included on Body Talk Pt. 1, in June 2010. The song was written and produced by Klas Åhlund, who wrote it for Swedish singer Paola Bruna who originally recorded it in 2002. Åhlund re-wrote it, added a chorus and made it more uptempo for Robyn's version. The electropop song carries a club beat, with synth arpeggios and energetic bass. Lyrically, it speaks of falling in love and being scared, and trust in a relationship.

The song was met with generally positive reviews from critics, who compared it to her previous singles "With Every Heartbeat" and "Dancing on My Own". The single reached number 2 on the Sverigetopplistan chart, becoming Robyn's 8th top 10 hit in her native country. It also reached the top ten on the Norwegian chart and the Hot Dance Club Songs chart in the US. The accompanying music video was directed by Max Vitali when Robyn was on tour in the United Kingdom. The clip shows scenes from concerts, her tour bus, in-store appearances and Robyn's sightseeing in London. The concept behind the video was Robyn wanting to make a simple video to show all the touring she had done in 2010. Robyn performed the acoustic version of the song on an episode of Gossip Girl, and included it on the setlist for the Body Talk Tour (2010–11).

== Background ==
"Hang with Me" was written and produced by Klas Åhlund, and was originally recorded by Åhlund's then-wife, Paola Bruna, for her debut studio album Stockcity Girl (2002). Åhlund played some of his old songs for Robyn, and re-wrote "Hang with Me" for her. Originally, the song did not have a chorus and Robyn noted that Bruna's version "sounded very different" from her own. Robyn's version was one of the first songs recorded for the Body Talk series, but she decided to save it for a later release to give it a chance of becoming a single. In an interview with Gary Graff of The Macomb Daily, she spoke of covering Bruna's song and altering the lyrics, "It didn’t have a chorus when we started working on it. It had a shorter verse and it was a ballad, so I decided if I could make Klas [Åhlund] turn it into a more uptempo and bring the BPM up, it could work. So we started there and he kept writing the song while we were recording, and it came out great." Robyn felt that she could be "seductive and sweet in a [sic] uncompromising way" on the song.

The song was announced as the first single from Body Talk Pt. 2, on 19 July 2010. The single artwork was posted on Robyn's official website on the same date, and the song premiered online the following day. An acoustic version of the song was previously featured on the preceding album, Body Talk Pt. 1. The single was released digitally in Sweden on 16 August 2010, and one day later in the United States. A CD single was released in Germany on 3 September 2010.

== Composition ==
Robyn – "Hang with Me"
A 22-second sample of "Hang with Me", featuring its energetic bass and synth arpeggio.

"Hang with Me" is an electropop and Euro disco song, written and produced by Klas Åhlund, and a reworked version of Paola Bruna's song. Genevieve Koski of The A.V. Club noted the similar "anthemic, emotional beats" of "Cry When You Get Older" from Body Talk Pt. 1. Tom Ewing of The Guardian compared its musical style to that of the Pet Shop Boys. Comparisons were also drawn towards her previous singles, "With Every Heartbeat", "Be Mine!" and "Dancing on My Own". "Hang with Me" carries a "fierce, club-wrecking beat", with "relentlessly energetic bass" and synth arpeggios. According to the sheet music published at Musicnotes.com by Universal Music Publishing Group, "Hang with Me" is set in common time with a metronome of 115 beats per minute. It is composed in the key of D major and has the sequence of Bm–A(add4)–D as its chord progression. Robyn's vocals in the song span from the note of B_{3} to the note of B_{4}.

Lyrically, the song speaks of trust in a relationship. Fraser McAlpine of BBC Music called the song a "fairly straightforward early-days relationship song about trust, from the perspective of someone who's a bit too tightly buttoned-up to let her defences down." In the chorus, Robyn sings "Just don't fall recklessly, headlessly in love with me." According to Nick Levine of Digital Spy, Robyn "urges on this ode to friendship, mutual support and generally not being a fool who rushes in." Tyler Grisham of Pitchfork noted that Robyn's "vocals are echoed by a robotic self-harmony" and that "she seems to be encouraging herself twice as hard to believe the song's words." Speaking of the song, Robyn said, "It’s a sweet song. Beautiful and bitter sweet, It’s about falling in love and being scared."

== Critical reception ==
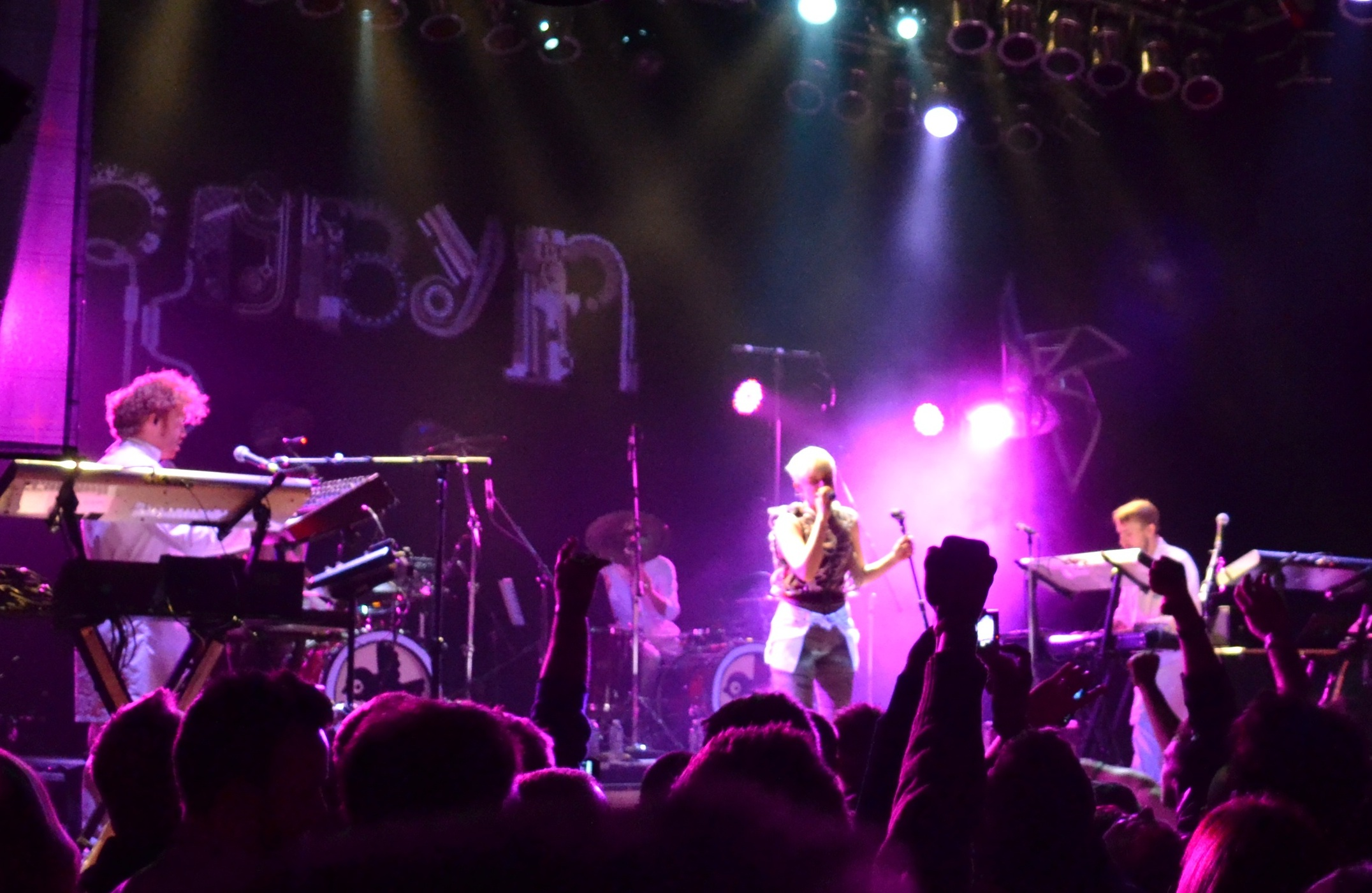
Robyn performing "Hang with Me" on the Body Talk Tour

Erika Berlin of Rolling Stone said that the song proves that Robyn "can crank out catchy jams as fast as pop's biggest hitmakers." Tyler Grisham of Pitchfork noted Robyn's ability to synthesize "disparate moods and feelings in a single track." He concluded by saying that "it would take lesser pop artists an entire album to explore the wide spectrum of emotions that she can express in less than four minutes." Robert Ballantyne of music website Popjournalism described it as "both a peppy pop track and a ballad", and called it Robyn's best single yet, stating, "Producer and long-time Robyn collaborator Klas Åhlund adds just the right amount of au courant electro-pop into the mix, but not too much to doom the track to the dance-club ghetto." Nick Levine of Digital Spy gave the song four out of five stars, and wrote that "What began life as a subdued-but-beautiful strings 'n' piano ballad is now a strident electropop tune that percolates as enviably as your next door neighbour's brand new coffee maker."

Tom Ewing of The Guardian referred it to as the "perfect counterpoint" to "Dancing on My Own", and praised it for "sound[ing] like the best Pet Shop Boys record in 15 years." MTV News named the song the twenty-first best of 2010, with James Montgomery calling it a "rather fragile, heartbreaking exploration of those first tentative steps into (or out of) love". Montgomery pointed out that "Robyn cautions us not to fall “recklessly, headlessly” in love with her, but when she makes songs as good as “Hang With Me,” it's sort of difficult not to."

== Chart performance ==
"Hang with Me" debuted at number seven on the Sverigetopplistan chart, the issue dated 27 August 2010, becoming Robyn's eighth top ten hit on the chart. Eight weeks later, on the issue dated 22 October 2010, it reached its peak of number two. In Denmark, the song debuted at number thirty-nine on the issue dated 10 September 2010. The following week, it rose to number eleven, which became its peak. In Norway, it debuted at number twenty and fell off the chart once, before reaching its peak of number seven. The song charted moderately in mainland Europe, reaching number fifty-three on Billboard European Hot 100 Singles. On the UK Singles Chart, the song debuted and peaked at number fifty-four. The song also reached number sixty-eight in Germany, and number ten on the US Hot Dance Club Songs chart.

== Music video ==
The music video for "Hang with Me" was filmed over a two-week period in June 2010, in London. It was directed by Max Vitali, who previously worked with Robyn on the music video for "Dancing on My Own" (2010). In an interview with MTV UK, Robyn explained the main concept behind the video, stating, "I wanted to see if it could be organic too, Like Twitter and my website. We decided to make something simple that gives the feeling of touring intensity. [...] I wanted a video which connected back through the touring which I’m doing all year." The video shows clips of Robyn's everyday life, including the tour bus, hotel rooms and in-store appearances, additionally Coco Sumner features briefly in the video. as well as concerts at Rough Trade Records and the nightclub Heaven.

The video premiered via Robyn's official Vimeo account on 26 July 2010. Jason Lipshutz of Billboard commented on the clip, "The video matches Robyn's gorgeous pop vocals with a fast-moving account of her life on the road, which includes riding roller coasters, prettying up for photo shoots and jamming out with her headphones on in a hotel room. It all culminates with a thrilling depiction of the singer's live show at the end of the clip." In what Kyle Anderson of MTV Newsroom considered the "clip's key scene", Robyn "sits at a nondescript restaurant and nibbles on an English breakfast while people look on curiously." Ron Slomowicz of About.com said that the simple video proves that "Robyn videos are more like a “gift with purchase” than what really sells her music."

== Live performances ==
On 13 August 2010, Robyn performed the acoustic version of the song on iHeartRadio. On 18 December 2010, she performed the song alongside "With Every Heartbeat" at the Swedish event Musikhjälpen. After the performance, her denim jacket was auctioned for charity. She also performed the song during the Body Talk Tour. She performed the acoustic version during a birthday party on the 1 November 2010 episode of Gossip Girl. The show's producers asked if she could perform the song. She spoke of the appearance with Entertainment Weekly, saying, "[I have] no lines, but there's a little bit of interaction with me and someone—it was more reacting, because we didn’t really act too much."

== Formats and track listings ==
- Digital download
1. "Hang with Me" – 4:19
- Germany digital EP
1. "Hang with Me" (Original) – 4:21
2. "Hang with Me" (Edit) – 3:32
3. "Hang with Me" (Avicii's Exclusive Club Mix) – 7:15
4. "Hang with Me" (Kaiserdisco Remix) – 8:35
5. "Hang with Me" (Starsmith Remix) – 6:04
6. "Hang with Me" (Reset! Remix) – 4:50
7. "Hang with Me" (Tim Bergling And Avicii's Exclusive Club Edit) – 3:44
8. "Hang with Me" (Music video) – 3:37
- Germany CD single
1. "Hang with Me" (Original) – 4:21
2. "Hang with Me" (Avicii's Exclusive Club Mix) – 7:15
- Sweden digital download
1. "Hang with Me" (Edit) – 3:31
- Sweden digital remixes – EP
1. "Hang with Me" (Kaiserdisco Remix) – 8:34
2. "Hang with Me" (Starsmith Remix) – 6:04
3. "Hang with Me" (Pumped By Hot City) – 4:00
4. "Hang with Me" (Reset! Remix) – 4:49
5. "Hang with Me" (Avicii's Exclusive Club Mix) – 7:14
- UK digital EP
1. "Hang with Me" – 4:22
2. "Hang with Me" (Avicii's Exclusive Club Mix) – 7:14
3. "Hang with Me" (Kaiserdisco Remix) – 8:34
4. "Hang with Me" (Pumped By Hot City) – 4:00
- Axel Boman Remix
1. "Hang with Me" (Axel Boman Remix) - 6:21

== Credits and personnel ==
- Klas Åhlund – songwriting, production, instruments and programming
- Niklas Flyckt – mixing
- Tom Coyne – mastering

== Charts and certifications ==
=== Weekly charts ===
Chart (2010)	Peak position
Belgium (Ultratip Bubbling Under Flanders)	3
Belgium (Ultratip Bubbling Under Wallonia)	26
Denmark (Tracklisten)	11
European Hot 100 Singles (Billboard)	53
Germany (GfK)	68
Norway (VG-lista)	7
Sweden (Sverigetopplistan)	2
UK Singles (OCC)	54
US Dance Club Songs (Billboard)	10

=== Year-end charts ===
Chart (2010)	Position
Swedish Singles Chart	20

=== Certifications ===
Country	Provider	Certification
Denmark	IFPI	Gold

== Release history ==
List of release dates, showing country, formats released, and record label
Country	Release date	Format(s)	Label
Sweden	16 August 2010	Digital download	Konichiwa Records
United States	17 August 2010	Digital download	Interscope Records
Germany	3 September 2010	CD single	Ministry of Sound
Australia	10 September 2010	Digital download	Konichiwa Records
United Kingdom	12 September 2010	Digital download	Universal Music
France	13 September 2010	Digital download	Universal Music
Various	24 June 2016	Digital remix single	Konichiwa
