= Cardiac Arrest (Teddybears song) =

Single by Teddybears featuring Robyn

from the album Devil's Music
- Released: 15 March 2011
- Genre: Disco
- Length: 3:47
- Label: Big Beat, Atlantic
- Songwriters: Klas Åhlund, Joakim Åhlund, Patrik Arve
- Producer: Teddybears

Teddybears singles chronology
"Rocket Scientist" (2010)	"Cardiac Arrest" (2011)

Robyn singles chronology
"Indestructible" (2010)	"Cardiac Arrest" (2011)	"Call Your Girlfriend" (2011)

Audio video
- "Cardiac Arrest" on YouTube

"Cardiac Arrest" is a song by Swedish electronic group Teddybears, taken from their sixth studio album Devil's Music (2010). It was released as the album's international lead single on 15 March 2011, in the United States and Canada.

== Composition ==
"Cardiac Arrest" originally featured singer Maipei on the Sweden edition of Devil's Music, released in March 2010. Robyn replaced her on the single edition, as well as on the international edition of the album. "Cardiac Arrest" is a song with disco influences, as well as psychedelic guitars and skittering synths. According to Kevin O'Donnell of Spin, the song "transforms into a white-hot anthem in the chorus, as Robyn delivers tongue-twisting, hip-hop-inspired lines." It features lines such as "Baby Barbie on barbiturates", and commands the listener to "Shake your bone maker" in the chorus.

== Critical reception ==
Jon Dolan of Rolling Stone rated the song three and a half stars out of five, and wrote: "While her fellow Swedes Teddybears make frothy disco rock, Robyn coyly disses a drugged-up young woman. Call it a pinch of arsenic in a tequila shot." Jason Newman of MTV Buzzworthy was concerned about a line in the song, writing, "we're slightly unnerved at countless 14-year-olds now mimicking the singer's request to 'Shake your bone maker'." However, Newman wrote that "we can't deny the catchy, summer-ready vibe of the song."

== Release history ==
Release dates, record label and format details
Country	Date	Format	Label
United States	15 March 2011	Digital download	Big Beat, Atlantic
Canada	15 March 2011	Digital download	Big Beat, Atlantic
