= Stockcity Girl =

Studio album by Paola Bruna
- Released: 2002
- Genre: Pop
- Label: Virgin, Dolores Recordings
- Producer: Klas Åhlund, Lars Halapi, Alexander Purple

Singles from Stockcity Girl
- 1. "Above the Candystore" Released: 2002; 2. "Interstellar Love" Released: 2002

Stockcity Girl is the debut studio album by Swedish singer Paola Bruna, released in 2002. It was preceded by the lead single, "Above the Candystore", which peaked at number twenty-six on the Swedish Singles Chart.

== Track listing ==
1. "Get Some" – 1:18
2. "Fine Without You" – 2:59
3. "Above the Candystore" – 3:17
4. "Yours to Keep" – 3:15
5. "Back Then" – 2:26
6. "Hang with Me" – 3:29
7. "Interstellar Love" – 3:21
8. "Allt på ett kort" – 1:31
9. "The Girl U Want" – 3:01
10. "Keep It Out of My Face" – 2:58
11. "Stockcity Girl" – 3:20
12. "Never Had Never Will" – 2:36
13. "Sinus" – 1:09

== Charts ==
Chart (2002)	Peak position
Swedish Albums Chart	15
