= Body Talk Pt. 1 =

Studio album by Robyn
- Released: 11 June 2010
- Recorded: 2009–2010
- Genres: Synth-pop; dance-pop
- Length: 30:31
- Label: Konichiwa
- Producers: Klas Åhlund; Patrik Berger; Diplo; Röyksopp

Robyn chronology
Robyn (2005)	Body Talk Pt. 1 (2010)	Body Talk Pt. 2 (2010)

Alternative cover
- North American cover

Singles from Body Talk Pt. 1
- 1. "Dancing On My Own" Released: 1 June 2010

Body Talk Pt. 1 is the fifth studio album (third internationally released) by Swedish singer Robyn, released on 11 June 2010 by Konichiwa Records. It is the first part of the Body Talk series, which consists of three mini-albums. The only single from the album, "Dancing On My Own", was released on 1 June. Robyn promoted the album with the All Hearts Tour she co-headlined with Kelis. Body Talk Pt. 1 reached number one in Sweden and number four in Denmark and Norway. In the United States, it peaked at number three on Billboard's Dance/Electronic Albums chart.

== Background ==
Following Robyn's career relaunch and "indie" rebrand with the release of her synthpop "breakthrough" Robyn in Sweden in spring 2005, she promoted and toured the record with several subsequent editions and singles globally, taking advantage of the mid-2000s social media explosion to "amass a new 'netroots' fanbase" until the winter of late 2008. Work began on the album in July 2009 in Stockholm with Swedish producer Klas Åhlund, who also served as its executive producer. Returning to recording, Robyn revisited the records she loved and drew inspiration from including Laurie Anderson's Big Science, Prince's Dirty Mind, the Knife's Silent Shout, Janet Jackson's Control, Technotronic's Pump Up the Jam, Kate Bush's The Kick Inside, Black Box's Dreamland and work by Kraftwerk, David Bowie, KLF, TLC, Neneh Cherry, Dr. Alban, Gossip, DJ Mujava, Booka Shade and Gui Boratto.

In early spring 2010, in an interview with Swedish magazine Bon, Robyn announced that she had plans to release three new albums throughout the year: "I got all these great songs so why not? [...] It's been 5 years since Robyn and I didn't want to wait with a release until they are all recorded, so I decided to start putting them out right away." Robyn told Popjustice journalist Peter Robinson, "It's been a long time since I actually made a record! And I was thinking of how to shorten that time down and Eric, my manager, came up with the idea of what if I just start releasing songs, then I can tour them, then I can make some more songs. We started working like that. I think once it starts it will make more sense – you can just keep releasing stuff without the long breaks." The release of Body Talk Pt. 1 was announced on 6 April 2010, alongside the cover art and track listing. Robyn said that "the songs that are on the first album are simply the first ones that were finished."

== Lyrics and production ==
In an interview with Pitchfork, Robyn talked about the main lyrical theme of the album: "The whole album is about being really lonely, but I think it's interesting to put that idea in a club where a lot of people are crammed into a small room." She particularly wrote the song "Dancing On My Own" with that in mind, and continued, "I've been touring so much the last three years and spent a lot of time in clubs just watching people, and it became impossible to not use that lyric—"dancing on my own"—because it's such a beautiful picture." Robyn told Billboard that Body Talk Pt. 1 is "a record about the dancefloor", and elaborated: "It's a really important place for my generation. It's the new church. It's where people go to experience something bigger than themselves." A number of songs on the record were inspired by Robyn's "juvenile" state of mind and her outsider perspective. She said, "I'm always going to be writing about those issues, it's what I'm fascinated by but I also think there's something about the state of mind you find yourself in a lot when you're younger, and you just want to get out of somewhere. You just want to do something. Feel things!" She continued that despite her age, "I'm always going to feel like this person on the outside looking in." Another theme prevalent on the album is "technology versus humanity".

Robyn – "Dancing On My Own"
A 28-second sample of "Dancing On My Own", featuring parts of the middle eight and chorus.

Robyn collaborated with Norwegian electronic music duo Röyksopp at their studio in Oslo on the song "None of Dem". American producer Diplo produced the song "Dancehall Queen" with Åhlund, which came together during a discussion of Ace of Base: "We were just having fun with that kind of genre music. And the idea of making this song came out of that discussion. It was fun. We really connected on something where music that you might put in one box becomes something else, depending on how you look at it." On the decision to record a dancehall-inspired song despite Robyn's nationality she said, "In my world, there are people who have already pushed those boundaries [of crossing styles] forward enough for me to feel comfortable doing a song like 'Dancehall Queen', so it's not a big deal to me." The last song on the album, "Jag vet en dejlig rosa" is a recording of a traditional Swedish folk song, famously recorded by jazz singer Monica Zetterlund. Robyn said, "I always listened to her, and she made this classic jazz album in the 60s [Waltz for Debby] with Bill Evans, which was quite a spectacular thing in Sweden at that time. 'Jag vet en dejlig rosa' was one of the songs they did, and when [producer] Klas [Åhlund] and I were in the studio, he bought exactly the same microphone that she recorded that album on. So we got all excited and decided to record the song."

== Singles ==
Robyn stated in an interview with Swedish magazine Nöjesguiden that she would release only one official single per Body Talk album. "Fembot", "Dancehall Queen" and "None of Dem" were released to digital outlets as promotional singles on 13 April 2010. "Fembot" and "None of Dem" were initially posted on Robyn's official website in March and April 2010, while "Dancehall Queen" had previously leaked under the title "No Hassle". Due to strong sales and frequent airplay, "Fembot" reached number three on the Swedish Singles Chart and number 10 on the Norwegian Singles Chart. "Dancehall Queen" was the only other song of these three that charted, peaking at number 56 in Sweden for a single week. The official lead single, "Dancing On My Own", was released on 1 June 2010. It became Robyn's first number-one single in Sweden. It reached number three on Billboard's Hot Dance Club Songs chart in the US, and became her fourth UK top-10 entry, peaking at number eight. It also charted in Denmark, Norway, Belgium (Flanders) and Germany.

== Critical reception ==
Professional ratings
Aggregate scores
Source	Rating
Metacritic	76/100
Review scores
Source	Rating
AllMusic	4/5 stars
The A.V. Club	B+
Drowned in Sound	7/10
The Guardian	4/5 stars
NME	7/10
Pitchfork	8.5/10
PopMatters	7/10
Rolling Stone	3.5/5 stars
Slant Magazine	4/5 stars
Spin	8/10

Body Talk, Pt. 1 received generally positive reviews from most music critics. At Metacritic, which assigns a normalised rating out of 100 to reviews from mainstream critics, the album received an average score of 76, based on 23 reviews. Heather Phares of AllMusic stated, "Capturing the freedom and loneliness of independence, Body Talk, Pt. 1 is a concise set of songs on its own, and an impressive first third of the whole ambitious project." Marc Hogan of Pitchfork raved, "With Body Talk Pt. 1, [...] Robyn doesn't just walk the line between what she has called the 'commercial' and 'tastemaker' realms. She obliterates it. Immaculately produced, fantastically sung, and loaded with memorable choruses, this eight-song effort has plenty to please everyone from post-dubstep crate diggers to teen tweeters—often at the same time." The A.V. Club's Genevieve Koski opined that it is "an album about aligning your heartbeat with the pulse of strobe lights and basslines, embracing synthetic sounds as a conduit for genuine emotion. Robyn's icy, controlled vocals and cool synth textures are almost alienating in their precision, but there's a beating pulse underneath the dance-bot artifice that captures the celebratory catharsis that can be found on the dance floor." Michael Cragg of musicOMH wrote that with Body Talk Pt. 1, Robyn is "ready to finally take her place at pop's top table of greats."

The Guardian's Michael Hann commended Robyn for her "defiant independence of spirit and her versatility within the pop idiom". Spin magazine's Jessica Hopper believed that on Body Talk Pt. 1, Robyn "confidently chronicles the heartbreak ('Dancing on My Own') and pleasure ('Dancehall Queen') of epic disco nights like she's ready to rule." Will Hermes of Rolling Stone called the album "near-perfect" and concluded, "Capped with a Swedish folk gem, Body Talk shows a dancehall queen with more than just blonde ambition." Slant Magazine critic Sal Cinquemani commented that "[t]he bulk of the album is comprised of stiff beats and in-your-face bluster that attempt to portray Robyn as more impenetrable machine than flesh-and-blood sweetheart." He added that "it also comes fully loaded with more hooks than your average pop album's entire tracklist." In a review for PopMatters, Jer Fairall expressed particular appreciation for the track "Fembot", and stated that "Body Talk, Pt. 1 shows Robyn working with the same tools that have served pop divas quite well since at least as far back as Madonna, if not earlier." However, he also noted that "[n]ot all of Body Talk, Pt. 1 works", referring to "Dancehall Queen" as "the only real bomb". Luke Lewis of NME called the album "impressive, but thin at eight tracks", while concluding, "Would it not have been better to hold back, and release just one, truly stunning record?" Matthew Horton of BBC Music felt that the album "triggers the sense Robyn's holding something back" and that it "houses so much filler", but nevertheless described "Fembot", "Dancing On My Own" and "Cry When You Get Older" as "scorchingly catchy, and laced with Robyn's familiar cordial of sparkling hook mixed with unutterable poignancy."

== Track listing ==
No.	Title	Lyrics	Music	Producer(s)	Length
1.	"Don't Fucking Tell Me What to Do"	Robyn; Klas Åhlund	Åhlund	Åhlund; Robyn^{[a]}	4:11
2.	"Fembot"	Robyn; Åhlund	Åhlund	Åhlund	3:35
3.	"Dancing On My Own"	Robyn; Patrik Berger	Robyn; Berger	Berger; Robyn^{[a]}	4:49
4.	"Cry When You Get Older"	Robyn; Åhlund	Robyn; Åhlund	Åhlund	3:35
5.	"Dancehall Queen"	Åhlund	Åhlund	Diplo; Åhlund	3:39
6.	"None of Dem" (featuring Röyksopp)	Robyn	Robyn; Svein Berge; Torbjørn Brundtland	Röyksopp	5:13
7.	"Hang with Me" (acoustic version)	Åhlund	Åhlund	Åhlund	3:18
8.	"Jag vet en dejlig rosa"	Traditional	Traditional	Åhlund	2:11
Total length:					30:31

iTunes Store bonus track
No.	Title	Length
9.	"Dancing On My Own" (radio version)	4:13
Total length:		34:44

Amazon MP3 bonus track
No.	Title	Length
9.	"Dancing On My Own" (PMS remix)	3:12
Total length:		33:43

=== Notes ===
- ^{^[a]} signifies a co-producer

== Personnel ==
Credits adapted from the liner notes of Body Talk Pt. 1.

=== Musicians ===
- Robyn – vocals (all tracks); instruments, programming (tracks 1, 3, 4); arrangement (track 8)
- Klas Åhlund – instrumentats, programming (tracks 1, 2, 4); arrangement (tracks 7, 8); Mellotron vibraphone (track 8)
- Patrik Berger – instruments, programming (track 3)
- Diplo – instruments, programming (track 5)
- Röyksopp – instruments, programming (track 6)
- Robert Elofsson – piano (track 7)
- Simona Bonfiglioli – strings (track 7)
- Claudia Bonfiglioli – strings (track 7)
- Erik Arvinder – strings (track 7)
- Patrik Swedrup – strings (track 7)
- Marianne Herresthal – strings (track 7)
- Pelle Hansen – strings (track 7)

=== Technical ===
- Klas Åhlund – production (tracks 1, 2, 4, 5, 7, 8); mixing (tracks 1, 7, 8); executive production
- Robyn – co-production (tracks 1, 3, 4)
- Niklas Flyckt – mixing (tracks 2–6)
- Röyksopp – production (track 6)
- Tom Coyne – mastering

=== Artwork ===
- Mary Fagot – creative direction
- Lucy McRae – art direction, body architect
- Johan Renck – photography
- Sandberg&Timonen (Adamsky) – typography

== Charts ==
=== Weekly charts ===
Chart (2010)	Peak position
Australian Albums (ARIA)	64
Austrian Albums (Ö3 Austria)	40
Belgian Albums (Ultratop Flanders)	37
Canadian Albums (Billboard)	54
Danish Albums (Hitlisten)	4
European Albums (Billboard)	30
German Albums (Offizielle Top 100)	46
Greek International Albums (IFPI)	17
Irish Albums (IRMA)	97
Norwegian Albums (VG-lista)	4
Polish Albums (ZPAV)	97
Scottish Albums (Official Charts)	75
Swedish Albums (Sverigetopplistan)	1
Swiss Albums (Schweizer Hitparade)	90
UK Albums (Official Charts)	47
US Billboard 200	97
US Top Dance Albums (Billboard)	3

=== Year-end charts ===
Chart (2010)	Position
Danish Albums (Hitlisten)	83
Swedish Albums (Sverigetopplistan)	5

== Certifications ==
Region	Certification	Certified units/sales
Denmark (IFPI Danmark)	Gold	15,000^{^}
New Zealand (RMNZ)	Gold	7,500^{‡}
Sweden (GLF)	Gold	20,000^{‡}
^{^} Shipments figures based on certification alone.^{‡} Sales+streaming figures based on certification alone.

== Release history ==
Region	Date	Format	Label	Ref.
Ireland	11 June 2010	CD; digital download	Konichiwa; Island	
United Kingdom	14 June 2010	CD; digital download	Konichiwa; Island	
Denmark	14 June 2010	CD; digital download	Konichiwa	
Finland	14 June 2010	CD; digital download	Konichiwa	
Norway	14 June 2010	CD; digital download	Konichiwa	
Sweden	14 June 2010	CD; digital download	Konichiwa	
United States	15 June 2010	CD; digital download	Konichiwa; Cherrytree; Interscope	
Germany	18 June 2010	CD; digital download	Ministry of Sound	
Australia	18 June 2010	CD; digital download	Modular	
New Zealand	18 June 2010	CD; digital download	Modular	
