= Jag vet en dejlig rosa =

Song
- Language: Swedish
- Genre: Folk song

Jag vet en dejlig rosa is an old Scandinavian folksong, which was written down lyrically in the 16th-century. The song was published in 1907 by Alice Tegnér.

== Recordings ==
"Jag vet en dejlig rosa"
Performed by Svea Jansson in a 1959 recording

The most renowned version was performed by Monica Zetterlund, and the record was released in 1964.

Swedish singer Robyn featured a cover of the song on her album titled Body Talk Pt. 1.

The song has also been performed in Arabic by Gina Dirawi in Melodifestivalen 2016.
