= Fembot (song) =

Promotional single by Robyn

from the album Body Talk Pt. 1
- Released: 13 April 2010
- Genre: R&B; hip hop; synth-pop; electropop
- Length: 3:35
- Label: Konichiwa
- Songwriters: Robyn; Klas Åhlund
- Producer: Klas Åhlund

"Fembot" is a song by Swedish recording artist Robyn, taken from her fifth studio album, Body Talk Pt. 1 (2010). The song was written by Robyn and Klas Åhlund, and produced by the latter. It was inspired by Robyn's personal experience of entering her thirties and contemplating children. With the song, she also argues against the notion that humans and robots are separate, explaining that technology has become more organic. "Fembot" is a song with an R&B vibe, and features Robyn rapping several double entendres in the verses, while proclaiming that "Fembots have feelings too" in the chorus. The song was released on 13 April 2010 as one of three promotional singles before the album's release.

"Fembot" was met with positive reviews from critics, with some of them highlighting its humor and lyrical content. Critics also noted the continued "android theme" present on a few of Robyn's previous songs, including the Röyksopp collaboration "The Girl and the Robot" (2009). Commercially, "Fembot" performed well on the charts, reaching number three on the Sverigetopplistan chart and number ten in Norway. Robyn performed the song for the first time on talk show Skavlan in April 2010 and later included it on the setlists for the All Hearts Tour (2010) and the Body Talk Tour (2010).

== Background ==
In an interview with music webzine Pitchfork, Robyn was asked if "Fembot" represented a dislike for the notion that humans and robots are separate, and she responded by saying, "The classic, dystopian theory about the future is not really as interesting to me. Like the book I, Robot is all about these robots that basically went nuts, and it's always because they were wrongly programmed by humans. It's like a mirror of our own psyche. It's almost like the wrong program could be a mental disease." She elaborated that "Fembot" is not "really about the future or about space or anything", saying that it is about the present time. "Technology is becoming more organic, and using the word 'fembot' or 'robot' in a song makes things more human to me", she said. In an interview with music website Stereogum, she explained that the song also chronicles her personal experience of "turning 30 and contemplating children". She elaborated, saying,

People expect things of you, like kids and like marriage, and I found myself just thinking of that a lot while making this record, so ["Fembot"] is about that in a way, but it's also fun. I'm playing around with the concept of being a woman, and what it means to physically be able to carry kids, but at the same time that’s not always what you see yourself as.

The song was uploaded onto Robyn's official website on 17 March 2010. It was later released to digital retailers in the United States on 13 April 2010, and in Sweden three days later. It was one of three promotional singles released before the release of Body Talk Pt. 1 and the official first single, "Dancing on My Own".

== Composition ==
Robyn – "Fembot"
"Fembot" is a song with an R&B vibe and features Robyn singing about her "fixation on androids".

"Fembot" was written by Robyn and Klas Åhlund, and produced by the latter. It is in the key of D major and a tempo of 123 beats per minute with a "heavy R&B vibe". According to Daniel Kreps of Rolling Stone, the song continues the "android theme" elsewhere present on Robyn's track, "Robotboy", the interlude "Bionic Woman" and the Röyksopp collaboration, "The Girl and the Robot" (2009). DJ Ron Slomowicz of About.com compared its musical and lyrical style to that of previous single "Konichiwa Bitches" (2007). According to Jer Fairall of PopMatters, the song utilizes "a spare, beepy two-note synth hook and a squelching electronic rhythm." Robyn's vocals in the song are layered with Auto-Tune and vocoders. During the verses, she adapts her distinctive rapping style, and exclaims lyrical lines such as "I gotta lotta automatic booty applications" and "I'm a very scientifically advanced hot mama." Nate Chinen of The New York Times wrote that Robyn "rap[s] a series of double entendres in a digitally processed purr", and then proclaims her "voguish fixation on androids" in the chorus: "I’ve got some news for you / Fembots have feelings too". According to Lindsey Fortier of Billboard, "Fembot" sees Robyn "get[ting] in touch with her urban side".

== Reception ==
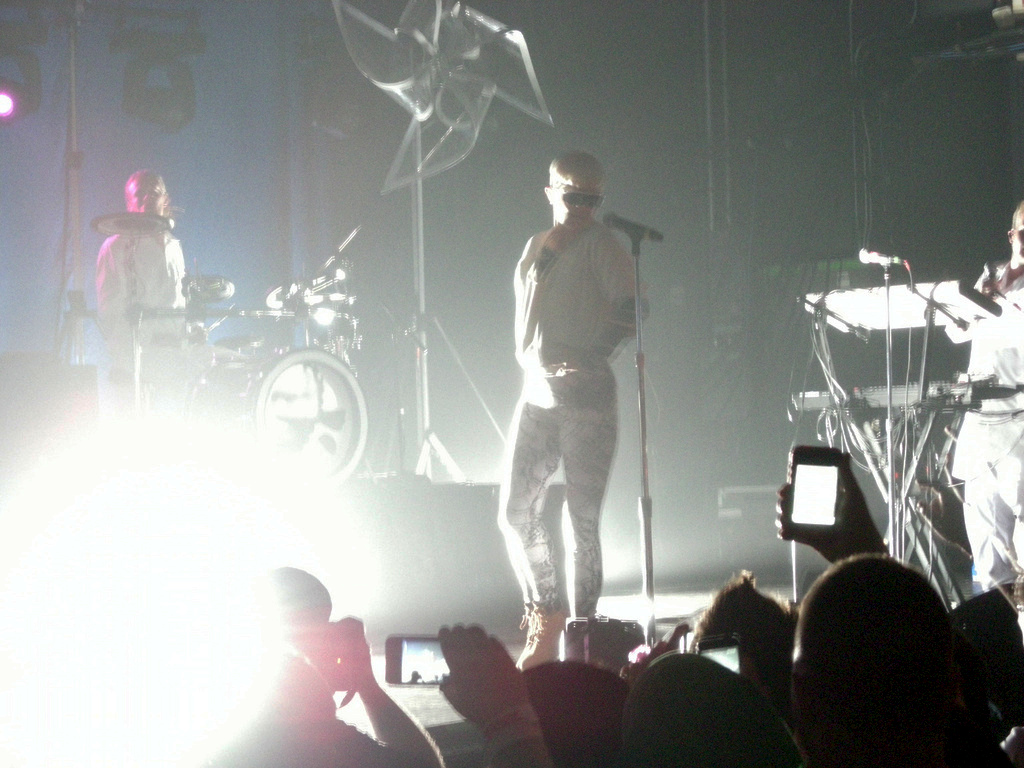
Robyn performing "Fembot" on the Body Talk Tour

Michael Gragg of MusicOMH wrote that "Though the lyrics are daft [...] its exuberance and general sense of fun is so infectious that when the chorus kicks in you barely notice what she's saying." Jer Fairall of PopMatters wrote, "Look no further than the wry chorus hook of “Fembot” for proof of Robyn's deftly subversive sense of humor." Fairall also pointed out that "[The chorus] might hint, at first, in the direction of some Blade Runner-esque sci-fi pathos, but Robyn turns it towards a canny meta-commentary on the fluid sense of authenticity that pervades 21st century pop stardom." Fairall, however, thought that "the verses are nothing more than an inventory of the titular ‘bot’s synthetic virtues." Ben Norman of About.com selected the song as his favorite track on Body Talk Pt. 1, and wrote that "'Fembot' is the incredibly quirky and well-written Robyn-rap track that needs to be heard to be believed." Christopher Muther of The Boston Globe praised the song for having "one of the most entertaining lyrics to emerge this year". The Independent wrote that the track "shimmers with the cleanliness of early OMD."

"Fembot" debuted at number seven on the Swedish singles chart on the issue dated 23 April 2010, becoming the week's highest debut. The following week, it rose four positions to number three, at which position it peaked. The song spent seven weeks on the chart, before dropping out in June 2010. In Norway, "Fembot" debuted at number nineteen on the Norwegian singles chart and peaked at number ten. The song debuted and peaked at number ninety-nine on the European Hot 100 Singles chart on the issue dated 15 May 2010.

== Live performances ==
Robyn performed the song on 16 April 2010 on the Norwegian-Swedish talk show Skavlan. A writer from music website Stereogum wrote that Robyn did the song very well live, and commented; "With just a keyboardist doubling as robot hypeman and two drummers, the performance is extremely faithful to the recorded version. It fact, it doesn’t really pop until the end and we get two seconds of Robyn doing the robot." Robyn also performed the song on the All Hearts joint tour with American singer Kelis during the summer of 2010. Robyn opened the show with "Fembot", which was preceded by a computerized voice counting down. Joanna Buffum of MTV Iggy wrote that the song "set the tone for the futuristic electro light show to follow". The song was also included on the set list for the Body Talk Tour. Similar to the All Hearts Tour, the show commenced with robotic voices over the speakers and backed by a heavy beat, before Robyn began singing "Fembot" as multicolored strobes lit the stage. However, for the second North American leg and onwards, "Time Machine" took over as the opening number.

== Track listing ==
- Digital download
1. "Fembot"—3:35

== Credits and personnel ==
- Robyn—lyrics
- Klas Åhlund—music, lyrics, instruments, programming, and production
- Niklas Flykt—mixing

== Charts ==
Chart (2010)	Peak position
European Hot 100 Singles (Billboard)	99
Norway (VG-lista)	10
Sweden (Sverigetopplistan)	3
