= Paola Bruna =

Swedish singer

Paola Bruna (born 7 February 1973), previously Paola Åhlund, is a Swedish artist and singer of Chilean descent who grew up in Dalarna.

Bruna was trained as a painter at Konstfack. Her efforts have included singing for Moder Jords Massiva, performing as DJ and releasing a solo album Stockcity Girl. She also sang in the Teddybears single "Yours to Keep". In 2002, Bruna's song "Above the Candystore" was featured in the independent movie Spun with a corresponding music video. Her song "Interstellar Love" was used in the snowboard film Follow Me Around from Mack Dawg Productions in 2006. In 2007, she contributed her voice for two songs for the Finnish indie band Tigerbombs.

Bruna was voted 'Best dressed woman of the year' by Elle Magazine Sweden in 2006.

Bruna was previously married to Klas Åhlund from the band Teddybears. In 2005, she had a son with her late boyfriend Anders Göthberg.

During 2007–2011 she was a radio host at the public service radio Sveriges Radio at the channel Metropol on 93,8.
