= Creative Allies =

- Website type: Crowdsourced Design and Digital marketing
- Founded: 2009
- Headquarters: Raleigh, NC, US, U.S
- Key people: Amie Thompson
- Website: www.creativeallies.com
- Registration: Facebook Connect
- Launched: March 2010
- Current status: Active

Creative Allies is a digital marketing and media company based in Raleigh, NC, known for its celebrity-focused, crowdsourced design campaigns. The company provides artists worldwide the opportunity to create original artwork for major sports and entertainment brands.

== History ==
Creative Allies was founded in 2009 by entrepreneurs Sean O'Connell and Greg Lucas. Seeing a need for emerging musicians to have high-quality designs for tour merchandise, the pair created both a platform and an online community to fill this gap. The process of crowdsourced design allowed artists to interact with their favorite musicians while providing musicians a low cost way to generate amazing art.

Over the years, the community of artists continued to grow as well as the brand recognition of Creative Allies. The company touts a roster of the biggest celebrity names in the music industry. Creative Allies took the same approach they used to become successful in the music industry, and expanded the business to serve consumer brands as well as sports properties.

The original founders and leaders such as Kevin Carroll and Donald Thompson have since moved on to other endeavors. In 2018, the board promoted Amie Thompson, its former Director of Operations, to the role of President & CEO of the company.

== Technology ==
Creative Allies developed a proprietary technology platform, a contest engine, allowing the company to effectively execute design competitions for its clients. The platform allows the company to build contests efficiently, allows creatives to upload submissions to each contest and allows fans to vote on favorite designs through the platform's voting apparatus.

== Hosted Design Competitions ==
Creative Allies is the home to more than 100,000 creatives from around the world, including solo practitioners and avant garde studio collectives. The company connects these creatives with a variety of brands to execute marketing design competitions to generate creative content and spark social engagement.

The company has hosted almost 2,000 design competitions including:

Music: Megadeth, Billy Joel, Twenty One Pilots, Mariah Carey, Motionless In White, Soundgarden, Kendrick Lamar, Slightly Stoopid, Petey Pablo, Maroon 5, Tom Chaplin, Bassnectar, Duran Duran, Beastie Boys, Counting Crows, Gavin DeGraw, Amon Amarth, X Ambassadors, Imagine Dragons, The String Cheese Incident, Kiss, Guns N' Roses, Rob Zombie, Fetty Wap, Rich The Kid, Willie Nelson, Ella Mai, Jefferson Airplane, Rootfire

Sports: ESPN X Games, High Country Grizzlies, Chris Paul, Ball Up, Monster Jam, Supercross, ModKidsUSA, and Jalen & Jacoby.

Arts & Music Festivals: Hangout Music Festival, Euphoria Music Festival, Gathering of the Vibes, Lexington Ave Arts Festival, Monterey Jazz Festival, Taste of Soul Atlanta, Camp Bisco, SXSW

Consumer Brands: Arizona Tea, BIC Cristal Pens, Ben & Jerry's, US Polo Association, Hard Rock Cafe, Toyota, Blackstone Brewing Company

TV / Film: Gilmore Girls, Bad Santa, The Big Bang Theory, MacGyver, Orange Is The New Black, Buffy The Vampire Slayer, Rich Kids
