= Dancehall Queen (Robyn song) =

Promotional single by Robyn

from the album Body Talk Pt. 1
- Released: 13 April 2010
- Genre: Dancehall; electronic
- Length: 3:39
- Label: Konichiwa
- Songwriter: Klas Åhlund
- Producers: Diplo; Klas Åhlund

Music video
- "Dancehall Queen" on YouTube

"Dancehall Queen" is a song by Swedish recording artist Robyn, taken from her fifth studio album, Body Talk Pt. 1 (2010). The song was written by Klas Åhlund, who produced it with disc jockey Diplo. The initial writing and production of the song arose from a discussion by Robyn, Diplo and Åhlund about Ace of Base. The song features a dancehall and reggae-infused sound with 1980s synths and bass. It was released as a promotional single before the album was launched in April 2010.

The song received mixed to positive reviews from critics. Some praised its hook and chorus, while others dismissed its overall sound. "Dancehall Queen" charted at number fifty-six on the Sverigetopplistan chart and was listed there for only a week. The accompanying music video, released in November 2010, was directed by Diplo, Red Foxx and Pomp&Clout. It resembles a karaoke tape with sing-along lyrics on the bottom of the screen. Robyn herself does not appear in the clip.

== Background ==
In November 2009, a video of Robyn and Diplo working on "Dancehall Queen" in the studio was posted onto YouTube. The song originally leaked onto the Internet in February 2010, under the title "No Hassle". In an interview with music website Stereogum, Robyn spoke of the song's origin, saying; "We [Robyn, Diplo and Klas Åhlund] were talking about Ace of Base and we were just having fun with that kind of genre music. And the idea of making this song came out of that discussion. It was fun. We really connected on something where music that you might put in one box becomes something else, depending on how you look at it." In an interview with music magazine Pitchfork, she spoke of the song's musical style, stating;

In my world, there are people who have already pushed those boundaries [of musical style] forward enough for me to feel comfortable doing a song like 'Dancehall Queen', so it's not a big deal to me. It's not about making black music as much as it's about making music that relates to real things that I grew up with. Back then, when Dr. Alban came to Sweden from Africa and started making reggae music with Denniz Pop—who did Ace of Base—it was too weird to be offensive. It's the same thing with Mad Decent and Diplo now.

"Dancehall Queen" was released digitally in the US on 13 April 2010, and on 28 April 2010 in Sweden. It was one of three promotional singles released before the album's release.

== Composition ==
Robyn – "Dancehall Queen"
"Dancehall Queen" is a reggae-infused song with Caribbean sounds influenced by Ace of Base.

"Dancehall Queen" was written by Klas Åhlund, who produced the song with Diplo. The piece is a dancehall song, with influences of reggae. The song incorporates 1980s dancehall synths and subwoofer wobbles. Nate Chinen of The New York Times called the song "an ode to 1990s Euro-dub". Noel Gardner of Drowned in Sound called it a "modern equivalent" of 10cc's "Dreadlock Holiday". The song utilizes electrified Caribbean sounds, influenced by Ace of Base. According to Ben Norman of About.com, Robyn "raggas her way through a laid back and bouncy electronic atmosphere". The chorus features Robyn singing "I still run this thing like a dancehall queen/I really don't want no hassle." The song also includes a shoutout to Sleng Teng; "I came to dance, not to socialize." According to Marc Hogan of Pitchfork, the song's title is a "sideways allusion" to ABBA.

== Reception ==
Marc Hogan of Pitchfork called the song a "so-wrong-it's-right collaboration with tastemaking Philadelphia DJ/producer Diplo." Hogan wrote that "It's here, dancing, with a chorus that Santigold and Gwen Stefani might kill for, that Robyn is free from all the worries that are "killing" her at the album's start." Christopher Muther of The Boston Globe wrote that "[Robyn's] take on Jamaican music has the potential to reek of day-old Ace of Bass", but called it "surprisingly solid". Noel Gardner of Drowned in Sound called it "frankly peculiar", and wrote, "It’s evidently laced with irony, and is possibly the most fun tune on here". Luke Lewis of NME wrote a mixed review of the song, stating, "It feels less authentic, especially on ‘Dancefloor Queen’, a misfiring collaboration with Diplo that features the least convincing patois this side of a George Lamb radio show."

Ben Norman of About.com wrote, "Nothing against 'Dancehall Queen,' but it just isn't the Robyn people have come to love." Robbie Daw of Idolator called it "subtle", and wrote that "it's hard to imagine this song being worked as a single", but concluded saying that it "definitely has an infectious hook". Anthony Balderrama of Consequence of Sound wrote that the song "is what you’d expect to hear: a smooth beat and an international sound, but nothing you’ll keep on repeat. It seems like a match made in heaven, but ultimately it’s fairly safe." Matthew Horton of BBC Music called the song "superfluous".

The song entered the Sverigetopplistan chart at its peak position of number fifty-six, before dropping out the next week. The song also peaked at number fifty-one on the Swedish Digital Chart.

== Music video ==
The music video for "Dancehall Queen" was directed by Diplo, Red Foxx and Pomp&Clout. It premiered on 29 November 2010 via Robyn's official YouTube account. Ryan Staake of Pomp&Clout referred the video to as a "really weird VHS/karaoke video". The video resembles a faded karaoke tape with occasional sing-along lyrics on the bottom of the screen. Robyn does not appear in the video. Larry Fitzmaurice of Pitchfork said that the video is "complete with awkward/sexy dancing and footage of bustling city life". Erika Brooks Adickman of Idolator wrote a mixed review of the clip, stating, "We’re guessing Robyn didn’t want the “hassle” of appearing, so instead we’re treated to—seemingly—random grainy footage of the streets of Japan and gyrating women as the words of the chorus appear karaoke-style on the screen. We can say one good thing about the flick, if you were confused about the song’s lyrics, they’re fairly easy to read."

The video features dancing Japanese former Jamaican Dancehall Queen Junko Kudō.

== Track listing ==
- Digital download
1. "Dancehall Queen" – 3:39

== Credits and personnel ==
- Klas Åhlund – music, lyrics and production
- Diplo – production, instruments and programming
- Niklas Flykt – mixing

== Charts ==
Chart (2010)	Peak position
Sweden (Sverigetopplistan)	56
