= Klas Åhlund =

Swedish songwriter and record producer

- Born: Klas Frans Åhlund; 11 April 1972 (age 54) Stockholm, Sweden
- Occupations: Songwriter, record producer
- Years active: 1991–present
- Member of: Teddybears

Klas Frans Åhlund (born 11 April 1972) is a Swedish songwriter and producer. He is also a member of the band Teddybears along with Patrik Arve and his brother Joakim Åhlund.

As a songwriter and producer, Åhlund has worked with artists across a number of genres, including The Weeknd, Katy Perry, Kesha, Sugababes, Britney Spears, Swedish House Mafia, Robyn, Iggy Pop, Madonna, Snoop Dogg, Charli XCX, Ghost, Usher, Tove Lo, Axwell & Ingrosso, Taio Cruz, Ellie Goulding, Alesso, Carly Rae Jepsen, Eliot Sumner, Melody Club, Bo Kaspers Orkester and Weezer. He co-wrote Melanie C's single "What Could Possibly Go Wrong?"
