= Calum Scott discography =

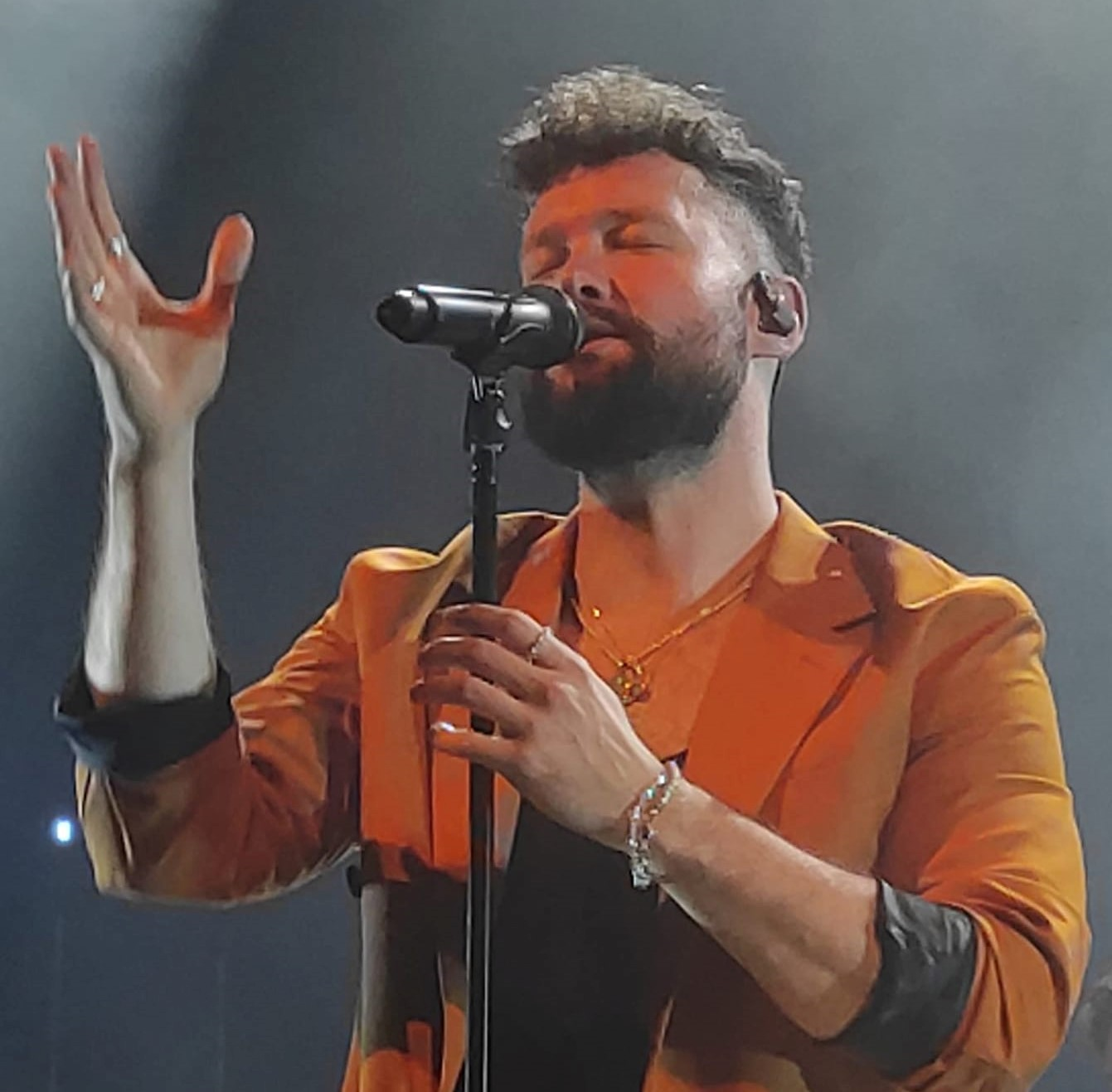
- Scott on the Bridges World Tour in 2022
- Studio albums: 3
- EPs: 4
- Singles: 28
- Music videos: 19

English pop singer Calum Scott has released three studio albums, four extended plays, 28 singles (including six as a featured artist), and 19 music videos.

== Studio albums ==
List of studio albums, with selected chart positions
Title	Release details	Peak chart positions										Certifications
Title	Release details	UK	AUS	BEL (FL)	CAN	GER	IRE	NLD	NZ	SWI	US	Certifications
Only Human	Released: 9 March 2018; Label: Capitol; Formats: CD, LP, digital download, streaming	4	5	35	27	34	19	75	26	13	66	BPI: Gold; ARIA: Gold; RIAA: Gold
Bridges	Released: 17 June 2022; Label: Capitol; Formats: CD, LP, digital download, streaming	48	12	80	—	52	—	—	—	6	— (Note: "Bridges" did not enter the Billboard 200, but did peak at number 58 on the Top Current Album Sales chart.)	
Avenoir	Released: 10 October 2025; Label: Capitol; Formats: CD, LP, digital download, streaming	31	29	—	—	33	—	—	—	12	—	
"—" denotes releases that did not chart or were not released to that territory.

== Extended plays ==
Title	EP details
Only Acoustic	Released: 26 March 2021; Label: Capitol/UMG; Format: Digital download
Only Collabs	Released: 12 April 2021; Label: Capitol/UMG; Format: Digital download
Only Love	Released: 23 April 2021; Label: Capitol/UMG; Format: Digital download
Only Live	Released: 21 May 2021; Label: Capitol/UMG; Format: Digital download

== Singles ==
=== As lead artist ===
List of singles, with selected chart positions
Title	Year	Peak chart positions										Certifications	Album
Title	Year	UK	AUS	CAN	DEN	GER	IRE	NLD	NZ	SWE	US	Certifications	Album
"Dancing On My Own"	2016	2	2	41	8	61	4	14	5	4	93	BPI: 6× Platinum; ARIA: 15× Platinum; BVMI: 3× Gold; GLF: 4× Platinum; IFPI DEN: 4× Platinum; NVPI: Gold; RIAA: 3× Platinum; RMNZ: 9× Platinum	Only Human
"Rhythm Inside"	2016	90	—	—	—	—	—	—	—	—	—	RMNZ: Gold	Only Human
"You Are the Reason" (solo and duet version with Leona Lewis)	2017	43	27	76	—	—	55	—	—	— (Note: "You Are the Reason" did not enter the Swedish Singellista Chart, but peaked at number 1 on the Swedish Heatseeker Chart.)	— (Note: "You Are the Reason" did not enter the Billboard Hot 100, but peaked at number 23 on the Bubbling Under Hot 100 chart.)	BPI: 2× Platinum; ARIA: 4× Platinum; BVMI: Platinum; GLF: Gold; IFPI DEN: 2× Platinum; MC: 2× Platinum; RIAA: 5× Platinum; RMNZ: 5× Platinum	Only Human
"What I Miss Most"	2018	—	—	—	—	—	—	—	—	—	—		Only Human
"No Matter What"	2018	—	137	— (Note: "No Matter What" did not enter the Canadian Hot 100, but peaked at number 30 on the Canada AC chart.)	—	—	—	—	—	—	—		Only Human: Special Edition
"Undo" (with Naughty Boy and Shenseea)	2019	—	—	—	—	—	—	—	—	—	—		Non-album single
"Biblical"	2021	— (Note: "Biblical" did not enter the UK Singles Chart, but peaked at number 41 on the UK Singles Downloads Chart.)	—	—	—	—	—	—	—	—	—		Bridges
"Where Are You Now" (with Lost Frequencies)	2021	3	5	26	6	5	1	6	12	7	— (Note: "Where Are You Now" did not enter the Billboard Hot 100, but peaked at number 35 on the Pop Airplay chart.)	BPI: 3× Platinum; ARIA: 7× Platinum; BVMI: 2× Platinum; GLF: 3× Platinum; IFPI DEN: 2× Platinum; MC: 5× Platinum; RIAA: Gold; RMNZ: 4× Platinum	All Stand Together
"Rise"	2021	— (Note: "Rise" did not enter the UK Singles Chart, but peaked at number 39 on the UK Singles Downloads Chart.)	—	—	—	—	—	—	—	—	—		Bridges
"Love Is Just a Word" (with Jasmine Thompson)	2021	—	—	—	—	—	—	—	—	—	—		Non-album single
"If You Ever Change Your Mind"	2022	— (Note: "If You Ever Change Your Mind" did not enter the UK Singles Chart, but peaked at number 99 on the UK Singles Downloads Chart.)	—	—	—	—	—	—	— (Note: "If You Ever Change Your Mind" did not enter the NZ Top 40 Singles Chart, but peaked at number 35 on the NZ Hot Singles Chart.)	—	—		Bridges
"Heaven" (solo or featuring Lyodra or Darren Espanto or Hoàng Duyên or Diana Danielle)	2022	—	—	—	—	—	—	—	—	—	—		Bridges
"Boys in the Street"	2022	—	—	—	—	—	—	—	—	—	—		Bridges
"Woke Up in Love" (with Kygo and Gryffin)	2022	—	—	87	—	—	—	— (Note: "Woke Up in Love" did not enter the Dutch Single Top 100, but peaked at number eight on the Single Tip chart.)	— (Note: "Woke Up in Love" did not enter the NZ Top 40 Singles Chart, but peaked at number eight on the NZ Hot Singles Chart.)	27	—	GLF: Gold	Alive and Thrill of the Chase
"Run With Me" (solo or featuring Anny Ogrezeanu)	2022	—	—	—	—	90	—	—	—	—	—		Bridges
"One More Try"	2022	—	—	—	—	—	—	—	—	—	—		Non-album singles
"Whistle" (with Jax Jones)	2023	14	—	—	—	59	17	32	—	—	—	BPI: Platinum	Non-album singles
"At Your Worst" (solo or featuring Zoe Wees)	2023	— (Note: "At Your Worst" did not enter the UK Top 100 Singles Chart, but debuted and peaked at number 20 on the UK Singles Downloads Chart Top 100 on 25 August 2023.)	—	—	—	—	—	—	—	—	—		Avenoir
"Lighthouse"	2024	— (Note: "Lighthouse" did not enter the UK Singles Chart but peaked at number 38 on the UK Singles Downloads Chart.)	—	—	—	—	—	—	— (Note: "Lighthouse" did not enter the NZ Top 40 Singles Chart, but peaked at number 31 on the NZ Hot Singles Chart.)	—	—		Avenoir
"Always" (with Armaan Malik)	2024	—	—	—	—	—	—	—	—	—	—		Non-album single
"Then There Was You"	2024	— (Note: "Then There Was You" did not enter the UK Singles Chart but peaked at number 86 on the UK Singles Downloads Chart.)	—	—	—	—	—	—	—	—	—		The Garfield Movie (Original Motion Picture Soundtrack)
"Roots"	2024	— (Note: "Roots" did not enter the UK Singles Chart but peaked at number 20 on the UK Singles Downloads Chart.)	—	—	—	—	—	—	—	—	—		Avenoir
"My World"	2024	— (Note: "My World" did not enter the UK Singles Chart, but peaked at number 26 on the UK Singles Downloads Chart.)	—	—	—	—	—	—	—	—	—		Avenoir
"Kid at Christmas" (with Christina Perri)	2024	—	—	—	—	—	—	—	—	—	—		Non-album singles
"Give a Little Bit" (with Leona Lewis)	2024	—	—	—	—	—	—	—	—	—	—		Non-album singles
"God Knows"	2025	—	—	—	—	—	—	—	—	—	—		Avenoir
"Die for You"	2025	— (Note: "Die for You" did not reach the UK Singles chart but peaked at number 51 on the UK Singles Downloads Chart.)	—	—	—	—	—	—	—	—	—		Avenoir
"I Wanna Dance with Somebody (Who Loves Me)" (with Whitney Houston)	2025	— (Note: "I Wanna Dance with Somebody (Who Loves Me)" did not enter the UK Singles Chart, but debuted at number 13 on the UK Singles Downloads Chart.)	—	—	—	—	—	—	—	—	—		Avenoir
"Unsteady" (featuring Aitch)	2026	— (Note: "Unsteady" did not enter the UK Singles Chart Top 100, but debuted at number 56 on the UK Singles Downloads Chart.)	—	—	—	—	—	—	—	—	—		Non-album singles
"Stay" (with Leony)	2026	—	—	—	—	—	—	—	—	—	—		Non-album singles
"Collide" (with Glockenbach)	2026	—	—	—	—	—	—	—	—	—	—		Non-album singles
"—" denotes releases that did not chart or were not released in that territory.

=== As featured artist ===
Title	Year	Certification	Album
"Light Us Up" (Matrix & Futurebound featuring Calum Scott)	2017		Non-album single
"Give Me Love" (Don Diablo featuring Calum Scott)	2018		Future
"Love on Myself" (Felix Jaehn featuring Calum Scott)	2019		Non-album singles
"Da Primeira Vez (From the First Time)" (Bryan Behr featuring Calum Scott)	2021		Non-album singles
"Rain in Ibiza" (Felix Jaehn and The Stickmen Project featuring Calum Scott)	2022	BVMI: Gold; IFPI AUT: Gold; ZPAV: Gold	Non-album singles
"Greatest Day" (Robin Schultz rework) (Take That featuring Calum Scott)	2023		Non-album singles

=== Promotional singles ===
Title	Year	Album
"Transformar (Theme from 2016 Summer Paralympics)" (with Ivete Sangalo)	2016	Non-album single

== Songwriting credits ==
Title	Year	Artist(s)	Album	Credits
"The Joke Is on Me"	2018	Boyzone	Thank You & Goodnight	Co-writer

== Videography ==
=== As lead artist ===
Title	Year	Director
"Yours"	2015	Astor Production
"When We Were Young"	2015	Shoot J Moore
"Dancing on My Own"	2016	Ryan Pallotta
"Dancing on My Own" (Tiësto Remix)	2016	Josh Killacky and David Moore
"Rhythm Inside"	2017	Howard Greenhalgh
"You Are the Reason"	2018	Frank Borin
"You Are the Reason" (Duet version) (with Leona Lewis)	2018	Richard Pengelley
"What I Miss Most"	2018	Ozzie Pullin
"No Matter What"	2018	Ozzie Pullin
"Biblical"	2021	Franklin & Marchetta
"Rise"	2021	Franklin & Marchetta
"If You Ever Change Your Mind"	2022	Harry Law
"Boys in the Street"	2022	Jackson Ducasse
"Heaven"	2022	Lewis Cater
"At Your Worst"	2023	Unknown
"Lighthouse"	2024	Unknown
"Kid at Christmas"	2024	Unknown

=== As collaborative artist ===
Title	Year	Director
"Transformar (Change)"	2016	Radamés Venâncio

=== As featured artist ===
Title	Year	Director
"Give Me Love"	2018	Patrick Van Der Wal
"Love on Myself"	2019	Ivana Bobic
"Da Primeira Vez (From the First Time)"	2021	Philippe Noguchi
