= Rain in Ibiza =

Single by Felix Jaehn & The Stickmen Project featuring Calum Scott
- Released: 25 February 2022
- Length: 2:21
- Label: Virgin
- Songwriters: Dennis Bierbrodt; Jürgen Dohr; Guido Kramer; Stefan Dabruck; Felix Jaehn; Daniel Deimann; Jon Maguire; Calum Scott; Felix Ferdinand; Zak F. Ron
- Producers: Junkx; Felix Jaehn; The Stickmen Project; Jon Maguire

Felix Jaehn singles chronology
"Happy" (2021)	"Rain in Ibiza" (2022)	"Do It Better" (2022)

Calum Scott singles chronology
"If You Ever Change Your Mind" (2022)	"Rain in Ibiza" (2022)	"Heaven" (2022)

Music video
- "Rain in Ibiza" on YouTube

"Rain in Ibiza" is a song by German DJ Felix Jaehn & The Stickmen Project featuring British singer Calum Scott. It was released on 25 February 2022.

Upon release Felix Jaehn said "I'm glad to have gotten to collaborate with talents like The Stickmen Project and to be reunited on this record with Calum Scott. It's a really lighthearted song about meeting someone new and the excitement that comes with that, and I feel like it’s exactly the right energy to kick off the year."

== Reception ==
Michael Major from Broadway World called the song a "pulsating pop/dance anthem". Akshay Bhanawat from The Music Essentials said, "The tune immediately kicks off with Calum Scott's textured vocal, quickly followed by a rising tension and a hefty bass drop. The propelling production is perfectly paired alongside a catchy beat, four-on-the-floor rhythm and a larger-than-life ambiance" calling the song "a prime party track to ring in the new year" and "a stellar addition to all three artists' flourishing back-catalogs".

== Charts ==
=== Weekly charts ===
Weekly chart performance
Chart (2022)	Peak position
Finland Airplay (Radiosoittolista)	96
Germany (GfK)	28
Poland (Polish Airplay Top 100)	5
Slovakia Airplay (ČNS IFPI)	3

=== Year-end charts ===
2022 year-end chart performance
Chart (2022)	Position
Germany (Official German Charts)	93
Poland (ZPAV)	16

== Certifications ==
Certifications and sales
Region	Certification	Certified units/sales
Austria (IFPI Austria)	Gold	15,000^{‡}
Germany (BVMI)	Gold	200,000^{‡}
Poland (ZPAV)	Gold	25,000^{‡}
^{‡} Sales+streaming figures based on certification alone.
