= Rhythm Inside =

Rhythm Inside may refer to:

- "Rhythm Inside" (Loïc Nottet song), 2015
- "Rhythm Inside" (Calum Scott song), 2016
