= Avenoir (album) =

Studio album by Calum Scott
- Released: 10 October 2025
- Genre: Pop
- Length: 40:54
- Label: Capitol
- Producers: Digital Farm Animals; Edd Holloway; Ben Johnson; Lvls; Jon Maguire; Dino Medanhodzic; The Nocturns; Johnny Reno; Corey Sanders; The Six; Charlie T; Andrew Yeates

Calum Scott chronology
Bridges (2022)	Avenoir (2025)

Singles from Avenoir
- 1. "At Your Worst" Released: 18 August 2023; 2. "Lighthouse" Released: 4 January 2024; 3. "Roots" Released: 12 July 2024; 4. "My World" Released: 4 October 2024; 5. "God Knows" Released: 4 April 2025; 6. "Die for You" Released: 23 May 2025; 7. "I Wanna Dance with Somebody (Who Loves Me)" Released: 12 September 2025

Avenoir is the third studio album by English singer-songwriter Calum Scott. The album was initially scheduled for release on 12 September 2025 through Capitol Records, but was later delayed and released on 10 October.

Upon announcement, Scott said its title references John Koenig's The Dictionary of Obscure Sorrows, a word-construction that defines "avenoir" as "the desire that memory could flow backward". "Avenoir refers to how we move through life like a rower moves: always moving forward but facing backward, seeing where we've been, but not where we're going. The songs on this album speak to both regret and sorrow, and to undying love—a plea to live life to its fullest."

The album was supported with The Avenoir Tour across the UK, Europe, North America and South Africa.

Avenoir was executive produced by Scott's long-time collaborator Jon Maguire. The album produced seven singles. In February 2026, Scott released a remixed, reimagined version of album track "Unsteady", collaborating with British rapper Aitch.

== Reception ==
Ryan Bulbeck from Renowned for Sound said "Avenoir is a quick and breezy pop record that sits firmly with its modern chart-topping contemporaries. There's nothing here to set Calum apart, but what's on offer here has been produced with a fine-tooth comb and presented with all the sheen expected from a singer of this calibre."

Vera Maksymiuk from Riff Magazine rated the album 7/10 and said "The album reads somewhat like a love letter to the failures, successes, relationships, desires, dedication and work that's led Calum Scott to this point."

Jo Forrest from Total Ntertainment said "The 14-song set showcases Calum's evolution as both a vocalist and songwriter, with an ambitious sonic palette that balances his signature soul-stirring ballads with groove-steeped romantic anthems." Forrest added "With his powerful voice and soul-baring song-writing Calum creates the kind of deeply resonant songs that are primed to become the soundtrack to our lives' most meaningful moments."

== Track listing ==
Avenoir track listing
No.	Title	Writer(s)	Producer(s)	Length
1.	"Lighthouse"	Calum Scott; Joe Housley; Jon Maguire; Charlie Martin; Corey Sanders	The Nocturns; Maguire^{[a]}	3:11
2.	"At Your Worst"	Scott; Nick Gale; Maguire	Digital Farm Animals; Maguire	2:47
3.	"Roots"	Scott; Richard Boardman; Maguire; Mike Needle	The Six; Dino Medanhodzic; Maguire^{[a]}; Lorna Blackwood^{[v]}	2:43
4.	"God Knows"	Scott; Housley; Maguire; Martin	The Nocturns; Maguire	2:50
5.	"Unsteady"	Scott; Housley; Maguire; Martin	The Nocturns; Maguire	2:17
6.	"My World"	Scott; Doug Bulford; Phil Bulford; Maguire; Adrien Nookadu; Josh Record	Lvls; Maguire	3:23
7.	"Die for You"	Scott; Maguire; Sanders	Maguire; Sanders	3:06
8.	"One More Drink" (featuring Lauren Alaina)	Scott; Nicholas Atkinson; Edward Holloway; Maguire; Roy Stride	Ben Johnson	3:13
9.	"Peripheral Vision"	Scott; Natalie Hemby; Johnson; Shane McAnally	Johnson; Johnny Reno; Maguire^{[v]}	3:27
10.	"Lose Myself"	Scott; Atkinson; Holloway; Maguire; Needle; Josh Record	Maguire; Holloway	2:44
11.	"Gone"	Scott; Maguire; Record	Maguire	2:59
12.	"Mad"	Scott; John Adams; Maguire	Maguire	3:10
13.	"Avenoir"	Scott; Adams; Zak Lloyd; Maguire	Maguire	1:26
14.	"I Wanna Dance with Somebody (Who Loves Me)" (with Whitney Houston)	George Merrill; Shannon Rubicam	Maguire^{[p]}; Charlie T; Andrew Yeates; Narada Walden^{[v]}	3:38
Total length:				40:54

=== Note ===
- ^{^[p]} indicates a primary and vocal producer
- ^{^[a]} indicates an additional producer
- ^{^[v]} indicates a vocal producer

== Personnel ==
Credits adapted from Tidal.

=== Musicians ===
- Calum Scott – vocals (all tracks), background vocals (track 1)
- Jon Maguire – guitar (1, 2, 7, 10, 11), bass (2, 4, 5, 7, 11–13), background vocals (3–7, 9, 10, 14), programming (5, 10–13), synthesizer (6)
- Charlie Martin – guitar, keyboards (1, 4, 5); synthesizer (1, 4), bass (1); drums, programming (4, 5)
- Joe Housley – background vocals (1, 4, 5), guitar (4), programming (5)
- Corey Sanders – background vocals (1, 7), programming (7)
- Nick Gale – bass, drums, keyboards, percussion, strings, synthesizer, synthesizer pads (2)
- Will Vaughan – guitar (2)
- Dino Medanhodzic – background vocals, guitar, keyboards, programming (3)
- Richard Boardman – drums, piano, programming, synthesizer (3)
- Lorna Blackwood – background vocals (3)
- Andrew Yeates – piano (4, 14)
- Zak Lloyd – piano (6, 7, 10–13), synthesizer (12, 13)
- Alex Davies – string arrangement (6, 7, 10, 14), strings (6, 7)
- Doug Bulford – additional keyboards, bass, drums, percussion, strings, synthesizer (6)
- Phil Bulford – bass, drums, flute, percussion, strings, synthesizer (6)
- Ben Johnson – background vocals, keyboards, programming (8, 9); guitar (9)
- Todd Lombardo – acoustic guitar (8)
- Rachel Loy – bass (8)
- Miles McPherson – drums (8)
- Sol Philcox-Littlefield – electric guitar (8)
- Dave Cohen – keyboards (8)
- Lauren Alaina – vocals (8)
- Johnny Reno – background vocals, bass, drums, guitar, programming (9)
- Dylan Jones – keyboards (9)
- Ciara Ismail – violin (10–14), string arrangement (10, 14)
- Braimah Kanneh-Mason – violin (10–14)
- Glesni Roberts – violin (10–14)
- Honor Watson – violin (10–14)
- Alexandra Marshall – cello (10–14)
- Rhiannon Fallows – viola (10–14)
- Kourosh Ahmadi – violin (10, 14)
- Olivia Holland – violin (10, 14)
- Rosie Judge – violin (10, 14)
- Seleni Sewart – viola (10, 14)
- Meera Raja – cello (10, 14)
- Rachael Lander – cello (10, 14)
- Edd Holloway – bass, guitar, programming (10)
- Midori Jaeger – cello (11–13)
- Richard Phillips – cello (11–13)
- Jordan Sian – viola (11–13)
- Elodie Chousmer-Howelles – violin (11–13)
- Emma Fry – violin (11–13)
- Stephanie Benedetti – violin (11–13)
- Jax Crawford – vocals (13)
- Jon Lilygreen – background vocals (14)
- Taylor Cousins – background vocals (14)
- Whitney Houston – vocals (14)

=== Technical ===
- Alex Ghenea – mixing (1–6, 10), engineering (3)
- Joe Zook – mixing (7)
- Jeff Braun – mixing (8)
- Charlie Holmes – mixing (9, 11–14)
- Matt Barnes – mixing (11–14), additional mixing (9)
- Randy Merrill – mastering
- Jon Maguire – engineering (1, 2, 5–7, 9–14)
- Marenius Alvereng – engineering (2)
- Nick Gale – engineering (2)
- Bob MacKenzie – engineering (4, 11–13)
- Charlie Martin – engineering (5)
- Ben Johnson – engineering (8, 9)
- Kam Luchterhand – engineering (8)
- Johnny Reno – engineering (9)
- Edd Holloway – engineering (10)
- Jeremy Murphy – engineering (10, 14)
- Charlie T – engineering (14)
- Louis Lion – vocal engineering (3)

== Charts ==
Chart performance for Avenoir
Chart (2025)	Peak position
Australian Albums (ARIA)	29
Austrian Albums (Ö3 Austria)	37
German Albums (Offizielle Top 100)	33
German Pop Albums (Offizielle Top 100)	15
Scottish Albums (Official Charts)	14
Swiss Albums (Schweizer Hitparade)	12
UK Albums (Official Charts)	31
US Top Current Album Sales (Billboard)	43
