= Rhythm Inside (Calum Scott song) =

Single by Calum Scott

from the album Only Human
- Released: 25 November 2016
- Recorded: 2016
- Genre: Pop
- Length: 3:31
- Label: Capitol
- Songwriters: Calum Scott; Corey Sanders; Kasper Larsen; Mitch Hansen; Jon Maguire
- Producer: Fraser T Smith

Calum Scott singles chronology
| "Dancing on My Own" (2016) | "Rhythm Inside" (2016) | "You Are the Reason" (2017) |

Music video
- "Rhythm Inside" on YouTube

"Rhythm Inside" is a song by British singer-songwriter Calum Scott. It was released on 25 November 2016 via Capitol Records, as his first original single, after his cover of Robyn's "Dancing on My Own", and the first single from his debut album Only Human. It was produced by Grammy Award-winning record producer Fraser T Smith.

== Background ==
Scott has been performing the song at live shows before its public release. "It is nice to perform a song that gets people moving," He said. "I have played Rhythm Inside live and at every show it is a song the crowd loves." said Scott in an interview by Hull Daily Mail "It is upbeat and happy and everyone just dances along. I have very high hopes for this song and I am really looking forward to releasing it."

He shared a preview of the song on 23 November 2016 via Instagram. Scott said that he is "excited", "nervous" and "buzzing" about the launch of his second single.

"I want to write real songs that mean something. Rhythm Inside is very different to Dancing On My Own which was about unrequited love. My new song is almost the opposite. It is very much about the internal response when you fall in love, such as your hair standing on end and blood rushing to your head." said Scott in the interview with the Mail. "It is something everyone feels and can relate to."

Speaking of the song's style, Scott said "This song has pace and rhythm. It has more meat on the bones. Dancing On My Own was stripped back but this has more production and much higher tempo. It is all whistles and bells."

In an interview with Billboard magazine, Scott said the song is "the polar opposite of 'Dancing On My Own'" "There are a lot of songs about love and how it starts, whether that’s realizing it yourself or coming to find it later on — but no sort of talk about the actual feelings that are created from love and passion. I wanted to go a little bit deeper into the internal side of it. Like, the beat of your heart, your hair is standing on end, and the adrenaline. I wanted to capture that. It’s a hopeful song and it’s more positive. And it doesn’t make people cry, which is a massive tick in the box."

== Music video ==
The music video was released on 18 January 2017 on Scott's YouTube channel via Vevo. It was directed by British director Howard Greenhalgh and shot in the United Kingdom. The video "captures the exhilaration and the uncertainty of a new romance" and "sees Calum surrounded by couples sharing a loving gaze and warm embrace."

== Critical reception ==
Taylor Weatherby of Billboard magazine said the song is "more upbeat than Scott's 'Dancing On My Own' cover" and "brings a little more happiness to his catalog." Spotify Editors of the same magazine said that the song "follows [Dancing On My Own] in a similar vein as the vocal stylings we've come to know and love Calum for, with the track's soft pop rock vibe finely framing his celebrated range as a versatile singer while accentuating his charm as a hopeful romantic." Ryan Amato of The Daily Campus said that the song "captures Scott’s pop-influenced sound" and is "a great step up from the song that put him in the spotlight." Nick Barnes of Unreality TV said that the song is "just as catchy as Scott's version of 'Dancing On My Own'." Similarly, David Watt of All-Noise regarded the song as a "feel-good and catchy" track.

== Track listing ==
Digital download
| No. | Title | Length |
|---|---|---|
| 1. | "Rhythm Inside" | 3:31 |

== Personnel ==
Adapted from Tidal.

- Calum Scott, Corey Sanders, Kasper Larsen, Mitch Hansen, Jon Maguire – composer
- Fraser T Smith – producer
- John Hanes – mixing engineer
- Manon Grandjean – engineer, recording engineer
- Rob Brinkman – assistant recording engineer
- Serban Ghenea – mixer

== Charts ==
| Chart (2016) | Peak position |
|---|---|
| Scotland (Official Charts Company) | 23 |
| UK Singles (OCC) | 90 |

== Certifications ==
| Region | Certification | Certified units/sales |
|---|---|---|
| New Zealand (RMNZ) | Gold | 15,000^{‡} |
^{‡} Sales+streaming figures based on certification alone.

== Release history ==
| Region | Date | Format | Label | Ref. |
|---|---|---|---|---|
| United States | 25 November 2016 | Digital download | Capitol | |
