= Only Human (Calum Scott album) =

Studio album by Calum Scott
- Released: 9 March 2018
- Recorded: 2015–2017
- Studios: Blue Room (West Hollywood); Deborah-J (Kingston upon Hull); MyAudiotonic (London); Paramount Recording (Hollywood); Poinsettia Place (Los Angeles); RAK (London); SuCasa (Los Angeles); TempleBase (Los Angeles); Wolf Cousins (Stockholm)
- Genre: Pop
- Length: 53:20
- Label: Capitol
- Producers: Jayson DeZuzio; Oak Felder; Oscar Görres; John McIntyre; Fraser T. Smith

Calum Scott chronology
Only Human (2018)	Bridges (2022)

Singles from Only Human
- 1. "Dancing on My Own" Released: 15 April 2016; 2. "Rhythm Inside" Released: 25 November 2016; 3. "You Are the Reason" Released: 17 November 2017; 4. "What I Miss Most" Released: 4 May 2018; 5. "No Matter What" Released: 19 October 2018

Only Human is the debut studio album by English singer-songwriter Calum Scott, released on 9 March 2018 through Capitol Records. The album was re-released in November 2018 as the "special edition" featuring four additional tracks.

== Critical reception ==
Professional ratings
Review scores
Source	Rating
auspOp	4/5 stars
Express & Star	5/10
Gay Times	4/5 stars
Metro Weekly	3.5/5 stars
Renowned for Sound	3/5 stars

Only Human received generally positive reviews from music critics. David from auspOp gave the album four of out five, and complimented the "personal" lyrics, writing: "Most of the songs here are a great listen and you can appreciate the effort that's gone into creating such a great debut". Francesca Lamaina of Renowned for Sound gave the album three out of five stars, saying: "Only Human is a decent debut album... Some tracks lack of spirit and suffocates among incessant repetitions. However, Calum Scott's voice is incredibly wonderful." Nick Levine of Gay Times gave the album four of out five and said that "Only Human offers a classy assortment of soulful stompers, gospel-tinged ballads and more reflective downtempo moments", adding: "This is an impressive and affecting debut that proves there’s much more to Calum Scott than a kinda surprising Robyn cover."

== Track listing ==
Only Human – Standard edition
No.	Title	Writer(s)	Producer(s)	Length
1.	"If Our Love Is Wrong"	Calum Scott; Philip Plested; Kane Parfitt	Fraser T. Smith	3:23
2.	"Give Me Something"	Scott; Jayson DeZuzio; Hayley Warner	DeZuzio	3:16
3.	"Rhythm Inside"	Scott; Jon Maguire; Corey Sanders; Kasper Larsen; Mitch Hansen	Smith	3:32
4.	"You Are the Reason"	Scott; Maguire; Sanders	Smith	3:24
5.	"Come Back Home"	Scott; Jordan Riley; Sanders	Smith	3:10
6.	"Stop Myself (Only Human)"	Scott; Warren Felder; Sean Douglas; Talay Riley; James Harris III; Terry Lewis	Felder	3:27
7.	"Dancing on My Own"	Robin Carlsson; Patrik Berger	Jon McIntyre	4:20
8.	"Only You"	Scott; Steve Garrigan; Mark Prendergast	Smith	3:45
9.	"Won't Let You Down"	Scott; Phil Cook; Sanders	Smith	3:14
10.	"What I Miss Most"	Scott; Oscar Görres; James Ghaleb; Sanders	Görres	3:51
11.	"Hotel Room"	Scott; Jamie Scott; Sanders	Smith	3:40

Only Human – Deluxe edition bonus tracks
No.	Title	Writer(s)	Producer(s)	Length
12.	"Good to You"	Scott; Phil Shaouy; Ross Golan	Phil Paul; Andrew Bolooki	3:50
13.	"Not Dark Yet"	Bob Dylan	Smith	3:35
14.	"Dancing on My Own" (Tiësto remix)	Carlsson; Berger	McIntyre; Tiësto^{[a]}	3:42

Only Human – CD deluxe edition bonus track
No.	Title	Writer(s)	Producer(s)	Length
15.	"You Are the Reason" (duet version, with Leona Lewis)	Scott; Maguire; Sanders	Smith; Chris Spilfogel^{[v]}	3:10

Only Human – 2018 special edition
No.	Title	Writer(s)	Producer(s)	Length
16.	"Need to Know"	Scott; JHart; Amy Allen; Danny Majic; Justin Franks	Majic^{[p]}; DJ Frank E^{[p]}; JHart^{[v]}	2:47
17.	"No Matter What"	Scott; Toby Gad	Smith	3:56
18.	"Sore Eyes"	Scott; Plested; Parfitt	KIN; Maguire	3:18
19.	"White Christmas" (1 Mic 1 Take/Live from Abbey Road Studios)	Irving Berlin	Scott	2:20

Notes

- ^{^[p]} signifies a primary and vocal producer.
- ^{^[r]} signifies a remixer.
- ^{^[v]} signifies a vocal producer.
- "Stop Myself (Only Human)" samples "Human" by The Human League.

== Personnel ==
Musicians

- Calum Scott – vocals (all tracks), background vocals (tracks 1, 3–5, 7–9, 16)
- Fraser T. Smith – drum programming (tracks 1, 3, 5, 8, 9), guitar (1, 9, 13), keyboards (1, 9, 17), piano (3, 9), acoustic guitar (3), programming (4, 15)
- Richard Pryce – double bass (tracks 1, 3, 5, 8, 11, 15)
- Chris Worsey – cello (tracks 1, 3, 15)
- Ian Burdge – cello (tracks 1, 3, 15)
- Rachel Robson – viola (tracks 1, 3, 4, 15)
- Reiad Chibah – viola (tracks 1, 3, 4, 15)
- Alison Dods – violin (tracks 1, 3, 4, 15)
- Louisa Fuller – violin (tracks 1, 3, 4, 15)
- Lucy Wilkins – violin (tracks 1, 3, 4, 15)
- Natalia Bonner – violin (tracks 1, 3–5, 8, 11, 15)
- Nicky Sweeney – violin (tracks 1, 3, 4, 15)
- Oli Langford – violin (tracks 1, 3, 4, 15)
- Richard George – violin (tracks 1, 3, 4, 15)
- Rick Koster – violin (tracks 1, 3, 4, 15)
- Claire Orsler – viola (track 1, 4, 15)
- Dion Wardle – piano (track 1), keyboards (4, 15)
- Jayson DeZuzio – bass guitar, drums, guitar, keyboards, percussion, programming, strings (track 2)
- Sally Herbert – string arrangement (tracks 3, 4, 15)
- Tobi Oyenrinde – music direction, conductor (tracks 4, 9, 15)
- Dawn Connie Morton-Young – choir (tracks 4, 3, 15)
- Isaac Opoku-Kyerematen – choir (tracks 4, 3, 15)
- Jayando Cole – choir (tracks 4, 3, 15)
- Keshia Smith – choir (tracks 4, 3, 15)
- Kwaku Agyemang – choir (tracks 4, 3, 15)
- Nathan J. Gardner – choir (tracks 4, 3, 15)
- Rebecca Thomas – choir (tracks 4, 3, 15)
- Shola Graham – choir (tracks 4, 3, 15)
- Simone Brown – choir (tracks 4, 3, 15)
- Reuben James – piano (tracks 4, 5, 8, 11, 15)
- Althea Edwards – background vocals (tracks 5, 8, 9)
- Paul Boldeau – background vocals (tracks 5, 8, 9)
- Sabrina Ramikie – background vocals (tracks 5, 8, 9)
- Ben Epstein – bass guitar (tracks 5, 8, 9)
- Bryony James – cello (tracks 5, 8, 11)
- Bryony Moody – cello (tracks 5, 8)
- Rosie Danvers – cello, string arrangement (tracks 5, 8, 11)
- Jamiel Blake – drums (tracks 5, 8)
- Camilla Pay – harp (tracks 5, 11)
- Emma Owens – viola (tracks 5, 8, 11)
- Nick Ban – viola (tracks 5, 8, 11)
- Anna Croad – violin (tracks 5, 8, 11)
- Debbie Widdup – violin (tracks 5, 8, 11)
- Eleanor Mathieson – violin (tracks 5, 8, 11)
- Jenny Sacha – violin (tracks 5, 8, 11)
- Patrick Kiernan – violin (tracks 5, 8, 11)
- Sally Jackson – violin (tracks 5, 8, 11)
- Stephen Morris – violin (tracks 5, 8, 11)
- Tobie Tripp – violin (tracks 5, 8, 9), string arrangement (9)
- Oak Felder – background vocals, programming (track 6)
- Sean Douglas – background vocals (track 6)
- Talay Riley – background vocals (track 6)
- Adam Wakeman – Hammond organ (tracks 8, 9)
- Dexter Hercules – drums (track 9)
- James Alan Ghaleb – background vocals (track 9)
- Oscar Görres – guitar, keyboards, percussion, programming (track 10)
- Phil Shaouy – background vocals, bass guitar, guitar, piano (track 12)
- Ross Golan – background vocals (track 12)
- Tiësto – remixing (track 14)
- JHart – background vocals (track 16)
- DJ Frank E – bass guitar, drums, guitar, piano, synthesizer (track 16)
- Danny Majic – bass guitar, drums, guitar, piano, synthesizer (track 16)
- Nate Albert – guitar (track 16)
- Ayo Oyerinde – piano (track 17)
- Frank van Essen – string quartet, strings direction (track 17)
- Jon Maguire – acoustic guitar, bass guitar (track 18)
- Adam Prosser – drums (track 18)
- Jon Lilygreen – electric guitar (track 18)
- Aled Rhys Evans – keyboards (track 18)
- MTM Choir – choir (track 19)
- Andrew Yeates – piano (track 19)
- Wired Strings – strings (track 19)

Technical

- Chris Gehringer – mastering (tracks 1–14, 16–18)
- Robert Vosgien – mastering (track 15)
- Phil Tan – mixing (tracks 1, 6, 8)
- Joe Zook – mixing (tracks 2, 4, 5, 9, 12, 13, 18)
- Serban Ghenea – mixing (tracks 3, 10)
- John McIntyre – mixing, engineering (tracks 7, 14)
- Ash Howes – mixing (track 15)
- Manny Marroquin – mixing (tracks 16, 17)
- Geoff Swan – mixing (track 19)
- Manon Grandjean – engineering (tracks 1, 3–5, 8, 9, 11, 13, 17
- Jayson DeZuzio – engineering (track 2)
- Oak Felder – engineering (track 6)
- Andrew Bolooki – engineering (track 12)
- Phil Shaouy – engineering (track 12)
- Brandon Buttner – engineering (track 15)
- DJ Frank E – engineering (track 16)
- Danny Majic – engineering (track 16)
- Kenta Yonesaka – engineering (track 17)
- Tre Nagella – engineering (track 17)
- Jon Maguire – engineering (track 18)
- Lewis Jones – engineering (track 19)
- John Hanes – mix engineering (tracks 3, 10)
- Chris Galland – mix engineering (tracks 16, 17)
- Bill Zimmerman – mixing assistance (tracks 1, 4, 6, 8, 11
- Dan Ewin – engineering assistance (tracks 1, 3, 5, 8, 11
- Ross Newbauer – mixing assistance (tracks 2, 5, 9, 12, 13
- Robin Florent – mixing assistance (tracks 16, 17)
- Scott Desmarais – mixing assistance (tracks 16, 17)
- Niko Battistini – mixing assistance (track 19)
- Rob Brinkman – engineering assistance (tracks 4, 9)
- Keith "Daquan" Sorrells – engineering assistance (track 6)
- William Delaney – engineering assistance (track 12)
- Connor Hughes – engineering assistance (track 19)
- Matt Jones – engineering assistance (track 19)

Visuals

- Katie Moore – design
- Frank W. Ockenfels III – photography

== Charts ==
=== Weekly charts ===
Chart (2018–24)	Peak position
Australian Albums (ARIA)	5
Austrian Albums (Ö3 Austria)	41
Belgian Albums (Ultratop Flanders)	35
Belgian Albums (Ultratop Wallonia)	90
Canadian Albums (Billboard)	27
Czech Albums (ČNS IFPI)	85
Dutch Albums (Album Top 100)	75
German Albums (Offizielle Top 100)	34
Irish Albums (IRMA)	19
New Zealand Albums (RMNZ)	26
Portuguese Albums (AFP)	19
Scottish Albums (Official Charts)	2
South African Albums (RISA)	7
Swedish Albums (Sverigetopplistan)	39
Swiss Albums (Schweizer Hitparade)	13
UK Albums (Official Charts)	4
US Billboard 200	66

=== Year-end charts ===
Chart (2018)	Position
Australian Albums (ARIA)	52

Chart (2019)	Position
Danish Albums (Hitlisten)	69
Swedish Albums (Sverigetopplistan)	64

Chart (2020)	Position
Danish Albums (Hitlisten)	72
Swedish Albums (Sverigetopplistan)	50

Chart (2021)	Position
Danish Albums (Hitlisten)	91
Swedish Albums (Sverigetopplistan)	72

== Certifications ==
Region	Certification	Certified units/sales
Australia (ARIA)	Gold	35,000^{‡}
Denmark (IFPI Danmark)	2× Platinum	40,000^{‡}
Norway (IFPI Norway)	Gold	10,000^{‡}
Poland (ZPAV)	Platinum	20,000^{‡}
Singapore (RIAS)	Platinum	10,000^{*}
United Kingdom (BPI)	Gold	100,000^{‡}
United States (RIAA)	Gold	500,000^{‡}
^{*} Sales figures based on certification alone.^{‡} Sales+streaming figures based on certification alone.
