= Bridges (Calum Scott album) =

Studio album by Calum Scott
- Released: 17 June 2022
- Length: 47:50
- Label: Capitol
- Producer: Edd Holloway; Jon Hume; Greg Kurstin; Zak Lloyd; Jon Maguire; Jesse Shatkin; Gabe Simon; Fraser T. Smith; Andrew Yeates

Calum Scott chronology
Only Human (2018)	Bridges (2022)	Avenoir (2025)

Singles from Bridges
- 1. "Biblical" Released: 10 June 2021; 2. "Rise" Released: 1 October 2021; 3. "If You Ever Change Your Mind" Released: 4 February 2022; 4. "Heaven" Released: 29 April 2022; 5. "Boys in the Street" Released: 1 June 2022

Professional ratings
Review scores
Source	Rating
365 Days of Inspiring Media	5/5
Entertainment Focus	5/5 stars
Riff Magazine	6/10

Bridges is the second studio album by English singer-songwriter Calum Scott, released on 17 June 2022 through Capitol Records. It was preceded by five singles—"Biblical", "Rise", "If You Ever Change Your Mind", "Heaven", and "Boys in the Street". Scott embarked on an ongoing world tour in support of the album, beginning in North America in July 2022.

== Themes ==
The tracks have themes of resilience, with Scott saying that he wrote "Rise" during COVID-19 lockdowns when he was "really down on [him]self", as well as the power of love, with Scott explaining that "Biblical" is about "love of biblical proportions that transcends everyone and everything", with "Heaven" following a similar theme of "the love between two people being so powerful that it is far superior to anything else". While "If You Ever Change Your Mind" was written "about the pain of heartbreak and lost love", it also has "undertones of hopefulness throughout".

== Singles ==
The lead single, "Biblical", was released on 10 June 2021, with second single "Rise" following on 1 October 2021. Third single "If You Ever Change Your Mind" was issued on 4 February 2022. The fourth single, "Heaven", was released alongside the album announcement on 29 April 2022. On 1 June 2022, Scott released the fifth single, which is his rendition of Greg Holden's "Boys in the Street".

== Commercial performance ==
On 24 June 2022, Bridges debuted at number 48 on the UK Albums Chart, with 2,158 sales. On 28 July 2022, Rise was played to welcome the delegations from the Crown Dependencies to the opening ceremony of the 2022 Commonwealth Games in Birmingham, England.

== Track listing ==
Bridges track listing
No.	Title	Writer(s)	Producer(s)	Length
1.	"Biblical"	Calum Scott; Corey Sanders; James Bay; Jon Green; Jon Maguire	Maguire; Lorna Blackwood^{[v]}	3:49
2.	"If You Ever Change Your Mind"	Scott; Hayley Warner; Maureen McDonald; David Gamson	Greg Kurstin	3:25
3.	"Run with Me"	Scott; Sanders; Maguire; Zak Lloyd	Maguire; Lloyd; Blackwood^{[v]}	3:21
4.	"The Way You Loved Me"	Scott; Rachel Furner; David Gibson	Fraser T. Smith	3:13
5.	"Flaws"	Scott; Maguire; Jordan Schmidt	Maguire; Blackwood^{[v]}	3:28
6.	"Heaven"	Scott; Warner; Nolan Sipe	Smith	3:14
7.	"Rise"	Scott; Gabe Simon	Maguire; Simon; Blackwood^{[v]}	3:36
8.	"Last Tears"	Scott; Nick Long; Jesse Shatkin	Shatkin	2:44
9.	"Half a Man"	Scott; Sanders; Maguire	Maguire	3:25
10.	"Goodbye, Again"	Scott; Tofer Brown; Emily Weisband; Daniel Nigro	Maguire	3:01
11.	"I'll Be There"	Scott; Nick Atkinson; Edd Holloway	Holloway	3:46
12.	"Cross Your Mind"	Scott; Sean Douglas; Jon Hume	Hume; Blackwood^{[v]}	3:32
13.	"Boys in the Street"	Greg Holden	Andrew Yeates	3:56
14.	"Bridges"	Scott; Danny O'Donoghue; Maguire	Maguire; Lloyd^{[a]}	3:20
Total length:				47:50

=== Note ===
- ^{^[a]} signifies an assistant producer
- ^{^[v]} signifies a vocal producer
- On physical editions, the song "Bridges" contains the hidden track "Father", which begins after several seconds of silence, making the track 6:06 in length and the album duration 53:56 overall.

== Personnel ==
Credits adapted from Tidal.

=== Musicians ===
- Calum Scott – vocals (all tracks), background vocals (tracks 6, 9, 12)
- Jon Maguire – bass (1, 3, 5, 10, 14), background vocals (1, 3), guitar (3, 5), drums (5, 7), programming (7, 14)
- Zak Lloyd – piano (1, 3, 5, 10, 14), background vocals (1, 5), programming (3, 5, 7, 10, 14), synthesizer (7)
- Corey Sanders – background vocals (1), guitar (3)
- Nerys Clark – cello (1, 5, 10, 14)
- Joseph O'Keefe – string arrangement, strings (1, 10, 14); violin (5)
- Crystal Williams – choir vocals (1, 7)
- Diana Stanbridge – choir vocals (1, 7)
- Jack Vasiliou – choir vocals (1, 7)
- Jeffrey Okyere – choir vocals (1, 7)
- Jenny La Touche – choir vocals (1, 7)
- Jordan Shaw – choir vocals (1, 7)
- Laura Vasiliou – choir vocals (1, 7)
- Otty Warmann – choir vocals (1, 7)
- Patsy McKay – choir vocals (1, 7)
- Shivonne Simpson – choir vocals (1, 7)
- Liss Jones – background vocals (1)
- Greg Kurstin – bass, drums, guitar, keyboards, percussion, piano, synthesizer (2)
- Lorna Blackwood – programming (3, 5, 7, 12)
- Adam Prosser – drums (3)
- Bryony James – cello (4, 9)
- Rosie Danvers – cello (4, 9)
- Richard Pryce – double bass (4, 9)
- Reuben James – piano (4)
- Emma Owens – viola (4, 9)
- Nick Barr – viola (4, 9)
- Ellie Stanford – violin (4, 9)
- Hayley Pomfrett – violin (4, 9)
- Helen Hathorn – violin (4, 9)
- Patrick Kiernan – violin (4, 9)
- Rosie Judge – violin (4, 9)
- Sally Jackson – violin (4, 9)
- Sarah Sexton – violin (4, 9)
- Steve Morris – violin (4, 9)
- Alex Davies – string arrangement, strings (5)
- Fraser T. Smith – acoustic guitar, drum programming, electric guitar, keyboards (6, 9); bass programming, programming (6); piano (9)
- Andrew Yeates – piano (6, 13), programming (13)
- Gabe Simon – background vocals, cello, drums, Hammond B3, percussion, piano, programming (7)
- Jesse Shatkin – additional vocals, bass, drums, drum programming, keyboards, percussion (8)
- Nick Long – guitar (8)
- Tommy King – piano (8)
- Ben Epstein – bass (9)
- Ash Soan – drums (9)
- Tofer Brown – piano (10)
- Edd Holloway – bass, drum programming, electric guitar, piano, synthesizer (11)
- Nick Atkinson – background vocals (11)
- Jon Hume – background vocals, drums, guitar, piano, programming (12)
- Amy Langley – cello (13)
- Rachael Lander – cello (13)
- Jordan Bergmans – viola (13)
- Rachel Robson – viola (13)
- Ciara Ismail – violin (13)
- Emma Fry – violin (13)
- Rosie Langley – violin (13)
- Millie Maguire – vocals (14)

=== Technical ===
- Mark "Spike" Stent – mixing, engineering (1–5, 9, 10, 13, 14)
- Rob Kinelski – mixing, engineering (6, 7, 12)
- Geoff Swan – mixing, engineering (8, 11)
- Randy Merrill – mastering
- Louis Lion – engineering (1, 7)
- Hywel Wigley – engineering (1)
- Alex Pasco – engineering (2)
- Ed Reyes – engineering (2)
- Greg Kurstin – engineering (2)
- Julian Burg – engineering (2)
- Lorna Blackwood – engineering (3, 5, 7, 12), vocal engineering (7)
- Jon Maguire – engineering (3, 5, 10, 14)
- Manon Grandjean – engineering (4, 9)
- Nick Taylor – engineering (4, 9)
- Charlie Thomas – engineering (5, 10, 13, 14)
- Callum James – engineering (5, 10, 14)
- Scott Barnett – engineering (6)
- Gabe Simon – engineering, recording arrangement (7)
- Jesse Shatkin – engineering (8)
- Samuel Dent – engineering (8)
- Edd Holloway – engineering (11)
- Jon Hume – engineering (12)
- Liz Robson – engineering (12)
- Tom Jordan – recording arrangement (6)
- Matt Wolach – mixing assistance (1–5, 9, 10, 13, 14)
- Casey Cuayo – mixing assistance (7)
- Eli Heisler – mixing assistance (7)
- Niko Battistini – mixing assistance (8, 11)

== Charts ==
Chart performance for Bridges
Chart (2022)	Peak position
Australian Albums (ARIA)	12
Belgian Albums (Ultratop Flanders)	80
German Albums (Offizielle Top 100)	52
Scottish Albums (OCC)	18
Swiss Albums (Schweizer Hitparade)	6
UK Albums (OCC)	48
US Top Current Album Sales (Billboard)	58
