= Whistle (Jax Jones and Calum Scott song) =

2023 single by Jax Jones featuring Calum Scott

Single by Jax Jones and Calum Scott
- Released: 10 February 2023
- Length: 3:02
- Label: Polydor
- Songwriters: Timucin Lam; Jon Maguire; Josh Wilkinson; Roy Stride; Neave Applebaum
- Producers: Jax Jones, Jon Maguire, Josh Wilkinson, Neave Applebaum

Jax Jones singles chronology
"Good Luck" (2022)	"Whistle" (2023)	"Me and My Guitar" (2023)

Calum Scott singles chronology
"One More Try" (2022)	"Whistle" (2023)	"At Your Worst" (2023)

Music video
- "Whistle" on YouTube

"Whistle" is a song by British DJ Jax Jones and British singer Calum Scott. It was released on 10 February 2023 via Polydor Records. "Whistle" peaked at number 14 on the UK Singles Chart.

== Music video ==
In the music video, Jones and Scott can be seen together with some other passengers on a London bus.

== Track listing ==
- Digital download and streaming
1. "Whistle" – 3:01
- Digital download and streaming – acoustic
1. "Whistle" (acoustic) – 2:47

== Credits and personnel ==
- Jax Jones – musical producer, primary artist, producer, programming
- Calum Scott – vocals
- Jon Maguire – producer
- Josh Wilkinson – producer
- Neave Applebaum – producer

Music Video Credits

- Cameron McHenry - Mini Jax
- Michael James Boateng - Dancer
- Seb Swanborough - Mandem
- Aisha Ikoghode - Aunites
- Mohammad Rashid Yusuf - Aunties
- Tanika Beckford - Aunties
- Troy Dixon - Mandem
- Molly Dee Chase - Couple
- Yumiko Hanasaka - Mother
- Brandon Williams - Couple
- Elijah Holloway - Mandem
- Clarke Quintayne - Dancer
- Rachelle Cox - Sassy Girls
- Eleni Jordanopoulos - Sassy Girls

== Charts ==
=== Weekly charts ===
Weekly chart performance for "Whistle"
Chart (2023)	Peak position
Austria (Ö3 Austria Top 40)	59
Belarus Airplay (TopHit)	1
Belgium (Ultratop 50 Flanders)	25
CIS Airplay (TopHit)	2
Czech Republic Airplay (ČNS IFPI)	2
Estonia Airplay (TopHit)	3
France Airplay (SNEP)	45
France Club 40 (SNEP)	27
Germany (GfK)	59
Germany Airplay (BVMI)	6
Hungary (Single Top 40)	24
Ireland (IRMA)	17
Kazakhstan Airplay (TopHit)	1
Latvia Airplay (TopHit)	7
Lithuania Airplay (TopHit)	48
Moldova Airplay (TopHit)	24
Netherlands (Dutch Top 40)	8
Netherlands (Single Top 100)	32
Poland (Polish Airplay Top 100)	3
Poland (Polish Streaming Top 100)	56
Romania Airplay (TopHit)	16
Romania TV Airplay (Media Forest)	10
Russia Airplay (TopHit)	1
Slovakia Airplay (ČNS IFPI)	5
Slovakia Singles Digital (ČNS IFPI)	78
Suriname (Nationale Top 40)	31
Ukraine Airplay (TopHit)	83
UK Singles (Official Charts)	14
US Hot Dance/Electronic Songs (Billboard)	33
US Dance Airplay (Billboard)	5

=== Monthly charts ===
Monthly chart performance for "Whistle"
Chart (2023)	Peak position
Belarus Airplay (TopHit)	2
CIS Airplay (TopHit)	3
Czech Republic (Rádio Top 100)	13
Estonia Airplay (TopHit)	6
Kazakhstan Airplay (TopHit)	2
Latvia Airplay (TopHit)	12
Lithuania Airplay (TopHit)	53
Moldova Airplay (TopHit)	33
Romania Airplay (TopHit)	21
Russia Airplay (TopHit)	1
Slovakia (Rádio Top 100)	7

=== Year-end charts ===
2023 year-end chart performance for "Whistle"
Chart (2023)	Position
Belarus Airplay (TopHit)	22
Belgium (Ultratop Flanders)	46
CIS Airplay (TopHit)	16
Estonia Airplay (TopHit)	71
Kazakhstan Airplay (TopHit)	9
Latvia Airplay (TopHit)	134
Lithuania Airplay (TopHit)	137
Netherlands (Dutch Top 40)	42
Poland (Polish Airplay Top 100)	11
Romania Airplay (TopHit)	65
Russia Airplay (TopHit)	13

2024 year-end chart performance for "Whistle"
Chart (2024)	Position
Belarus Airplay (TopHit)	85
CIS Airplay (TopHit)	139
Estonia Airplay (TopHit)	138
Kazakhstan Airplay (TopHit)	172
Russia Airplay (TopHit)	152

2025 year-end chart performance for "Whistle"
Chart (2025)	Position
Belarus Airplay (TopHit)	127

== Certifications ==
Certifications for "Whistle"
Region	Certification	Certified units/sales
Belgium (BRMA)	Gold	20,000^{‡}
Brazil (Pro-Música Brasil)	Gold	20,000^{‡}
Poland (ZPAV)	Platinum	50,000^{‡}
United Kingdom (BPI)	Platinum	600,000^{‡}
^{‡} Sales+streaming figures based on certification alone.
