= What I Miss Most =

Single by Calum Scott

from the album Only Human
- Released: 4 May 2018
- Length: 3:51
- Label: Capitol
- Songwriter(s): Scott; Oscar Görres; James Alan Ghaleb; Corey Saunders
- Producer(s): OzGo

Calum Scott singles chronology
"Give Me Love" (2018)	"What I Miss Most" (2018)	"No Matter What" (2018)

Music video
- "What I Miss Most" on YouTube

"What I Miss Most" is a song recorded by British singer-songwriter Calum Scott. It was released in May 2018 as the fourth single from Scott's debut studio album, Only Human. The track was inspired by Scott's time spent away from his family and friends. Scott said "I wrote ["What I Miss Most"] in Sweden and is an upbeat song with an optimistic view of my journey so far. It's about how I've gone from a normal Yorkshireman to being thrown into this incredible career but missing home and missing people back home and missing the town and the streets and everything."

== Background ==
Scott calls "What I Miss Most" his nostalgia song. In an interview with Billboard, Scott said "It's a complete tribute to my hometown. The crest for my city is three golden crowns on top of each other, so when I say, “Under three crowns when I'm far away” I'm trying to basically say I'm proud of Hull, where I'm from." On Twitter, Scott supported the statement saying "[What I miss Most is]..a song about missing my hometown of Hull, but I wrote it in a way that it could be about missing anyone or anything!"

== Music video ==
The music video was released on 16 May 2018 on Scott's YouTube channel via Vevo. It was directed by Ozzie Pullin. The video shows the various stages of a man's life from childhood to old age.

As of October 2021, the video has gained over 30 million views.

== Critical reception ==
Nathan Jake from Project U called the song the "highlight" from Only Human.

== Track listing ==
No.	Title	Length
1.	"What I Miss Most" (Album Version)	3:51

Digital download
No.	Title	Length
1.	"What I Miss Most" (Acoustic, 1 Mic 1 Take/Live from Abbey Road Studios)	3:48

== Charts ==
Chart (2018)	Peak position
Scotland (Official Charts Company)	83

== Release history ==
Region	Date	Format	Label	Version	Ref.
Various	4 May 2018	Digital download, streaming	Capitol	Album version	
Various	8 June 2018	Digital download, streaming	Capitol	Acoustic, 1 Mic 1 Take	
