= You Are the Reason =

Single by Calum Scott

from the album Only Human
- Released: 17 November 2017
- Genre: Pop
- Length: 3:24
- Label: Capitol
- Songwriters: Calum Scott; Corey Sanders; Jon Maguire
- Producer: Fraser T. Smith

Calum Scott singles chronology
"Rhythm Inside" (2016)	"You Are the Reason" (2017)	"Give Me Love" (2018)

Leona Lewis singles chronology
"(We All Are) Looking for Home" (2016)	"You Are the Reason" (2018)	"Amore" (2018)

Music videos
- "You Are the Reason" on YouTube; "You Are the Reason" (Duet version) on YouTube

"You Are the Reason" is a song by English singer Calum Scott. It was released on 17 November 2017 via Capitol Records, as his second original single from his debut album Only Human. It was produced by Fraser T. Smith. The song has been streamed over one billion times, and has sold over five million copies worldwide. The music video, which has been viewed over 1.4 billion times, was filmed primarily in Kyiv, Ukraine, with aerial shots of Budapest locations such as Széchenyi thermal bath. A duet version with Leona Lewis charted internationally, and achieved over 270 million streams on Spotify, with its music video duet surpassing one billion views on YouTube in September 2023.

== Composition ==
According to sheet music published at Sheetmusicdirect.com, "You Are the Reason" is a moderately slow tempo of 58 beats per minute. Written in 6/8, the song is in the key of B♭ major. Calum Scott's vocal range spans from C_{3} to B♭_{4} during the song.

== Music video ==
The official music video for the song was released on Calum Scott's YouTube channel on 5 January 2018. As of 13 September 2026, it has since gained nearly 1.4 billion views and 8.1 million likes.

The video shows Calum singing the song as he walks Kyiv's Khreschatyk Street, seeing couples and best friends walk by, making him feel lonely. The video then cuts to a scene in a house featuring a husband and a pregnant wife, then returns to Calum singing. He watches a family walking towards a car, but having the father separated from the mother and daughter. Calum leaves the scene and walks through the plaza overlooked by the Bell Tower of Saint Sophia Cathedral as the camera shows a spotlight being aimed at a building, which then shows a man inside the building talking to his anxious significant other.

The video briefly returns to Calum singing then shows a family, consisting of a husband, wife, and two adolescent children in a bedroom with the wife's sick elderly mother and the children's grandmother, depicting her last moments. The video returns to Calum fixing the collar of his coat, then cuts back to the scene of the sick grandmother, showing her dying as the wife cries. As Calum walks under a bridge, the camera cuts to a couple riding a taxi, with the woman giving the man an earphone to listen music to. The camera then cuts to Calum watching a couple dance in a spotlight. The scene briefly shifts to a clip taken from over the park, then returns to the couple dancing. Calum is later seen walking towards a man smiling with the spotlight following a girl running behind Calum. The two reunite and kiss as Calum walks beside them. Calum ends the song while looking at the camera and the video ends as he walks away.

== Leona Lewis duet and other versions ==
=== Leona Lewis duet ===
On 9 February 2018, Scott released a duet version of the song with Grammy nominated singer-songwriter Leona Lewis. Scott remarked in a statement: "Working with Leona was a dream come true. As a fan, I first remember watching her on TV before going on to grace the globe with her incredibly beautiful voice. Now having the honour of working with her on one of my own songs is completely surreal and the passion and raw emotion she brings to our duet makes it even more special to me."

The duet was promoted by Scott and Lewis, with performances on the BBC One's The One Show in the UK and Good Morning America in the US. The duet charted on various Billboard charts in the US, and also charted in New Zealand, Canada and in Europe. The official video for the duet, which features both Scott and Lewis, has since surpassed 706 million views on YouTube and over 334 million streams on Spotify.

In June 2019, "You Are the Reason" (with Leona Lewis) peaked at number 7 on the Billboard Digital Songs Sales chart. The song featured on America's Got Talent during the audition of Kodi Lee. The song also peaked on the Hot Canadian Digital Songs Sales chart, at number 14, following the shows airing.

=== Ed Sheeran duet ===
Ed Sheeran and Calum performed a version of the song on Sheeran's 2024 +–=÷× Tour.

=== Other duets ===
Scott released a version of "You Are the Reason" with Dutch singer Ilse DeLange on 21 May 2018. Additionally, Scott released a French version of "You Are the Reason" with French singer Barbara Pravi on 1 June 2018. Pravi and Scott sang in both English and French. The lyrics in the French sections of the song are not faithful translations of the lyrics from the same sections of the English version. Whereas the English lyrics describe the sensations the singer is experiencing while they ponder the deep significance of someone in their life, the French lyrics describe a turbulent relationship that the singer ponders is worth saving. For instance, the second part of the first verse in English is:

And there goes my mind racing
And you are the reason
That I'm still breathing
I'm hopeless now

The lyrics in the same section of the French version are:

Comme les lueurs fragile
Du soleil à l'automne
Mon coeur se défilent
Défait de toi

Translated into English:

Like the faint glow
From the autumn sun
My heart is running away
Get rid of you

== Track listing ==
Digital download
No.	Title	Length
1.	"You Are the Reason"	3:24

Digital download
No.	Title	Length
1.	"You Are the Reason" (John Gibbons remix)	3:30

Digital download (Duet version)
No.	Title	Length
1.	"You Are the Reason" (with Leona Lewis)	3:10

Digital download (Duet version)
No.	Title	Length
1.	"You Are the Reason" (with Ilse DeLange)	3:10

Digital download (French duet version)
No.	Title	Length
1.	"You Are the Reason" (with Barbara Pravi)	3:09

== Credits and personnel ==
Adapted from Tidal.

- Calum Scott, Corey Sanders, Jon Maguire – composition
- Fraser T Smith – production
- Phil Tan – mixing
- Bill Zimmerman – mixing assistance
- Rob Brinkman – record engineering assistance
- Reuben James – piano
- Kwaku Agyemang, Simone Brown, Rebecca Thomas, Shola Graham, Nathan J Gardner, Keshia Smith, Jayando Cole, Dawn Connie Morton-Young, Isaac Opoku-Kyerematen – ensemble/orchestra
- Shola Graham, Rebecca Thomas, Dawn Connie Morton-Young, Simone Brown, Nathan J Gardner, Jayando Cole, Isaac Opoku-Kyerematen, Keshia Smith, Kwaku Agyemang – choir

== Charts ==
=== Weekly charts ===
Chart (2018–2019)	Peak position
Australia (ARIA)	27
Belgium (Ultratip Bubbling Under Flanders) with Leona Lewis	24
Belgium (Ultratop 50 Wallonia) with Leona Lewis	11
Canada Hot 100 (Billboard) with Leona Lewis	76
Canada AC (Billboard) with Leona Lewis	32
Denmark Digital Songs (Billboard) with Leona Lewis	6
France (SNEP)	89
Hungary (Single Top 40)	31
Ireland (IRMA)	55
Malaysia (RIM)	1
Netherlands Digital Songs (Billboard) with Leona Lewis	6
New Zealand Digital Songs (Billboard) with Leona Lewis	6
Portugal (AFP)	58
Scottish Singles Sales (Official Charts)	6
Singapore (RIAS)	18
Sweden Heatseeker (Sverigetopplistan) with Leona Lewis	1
Switzerland (Schweizer Hitparade)	20
UK Singles (Official Charts)	43
US Bubbling Under Hot 100 (Billboard) with Leona Lewis	23
US Adult Contemporary (Billboard) with Leona Lewis	11
US Adult Pop Airplay (Billboard) with Leona Lewis	25
US Digital Song Sales (Billboard) with Leona Lewis	7

Chart (2020–2021)	Peak position
Global 200 (Billboard)	156

Chart (2022)	Peak position
Hungary (Single Top 40)	17
South Africa (RISA)	99
Switzerland (Schweizer Hitparade)	9

=== Year-end charts ===
Chart (2018)	Position
Australia (ARIA)	80
Belgium (Ultratop Wallonia)	74
Portugal (AFP)	123
Switzerland (Schweizer Hitparade)	33
US Adult Contemporary (Billboard)	23

== Certifications ==
Certifications for "You Are the Reason"
Region	Certification	Certified units/sales
Australia (ARIA)	4× Platinum	280,000^{‡}
Brazil (Pro-Música Brasil)	Diamond	160,000^{‡}
Canada (Music Canada)	8× Platinum	640,000^{‡}
Denmark (IFPI Danmark)	2× Platinum	180,000^{‡}
Germany (BVMI)	Platinum	400,000^{‡}
Italy (FIMI)	Platinum	70,000^{‡}
New Zealand (RMNZ)	4× Platinum	120,000^{‡}
Poland (ZPAV)	3× Platinum	150,000^{‡}
Portugal (AFP)	2× Platinum	20,000^{‡}
Spain (Promusicae)	Platinum	60,000^{‡}
United Kingdom (BPI)	3× Platinum	1,800,000^{‡}
United States (RIAA)	5× Platinum	5,000,000^{‡}
Streaming
Sweden (GLF)	Gold	4,000,000^{†}
^{‡} Sales+streaming figures based on certification alone.^{†} Streaming-only figures based on certification alone.

== Release history ==
Region	Date	Format	Label	Ref.
United States	17 November 2017	Digital download	Capitol	

== See also ==
- List of number-one songs of 2018 (Malaysia)
