= Dancing on My Own =

2010 single by Robyn

Single by Robyn

from the album Body Talk Pt. 1
- Released: 20 April 2010
- Genre: Electropop (album version); synth-pop (radio edit); acoustic (Live Lounge)
- Length: 4:49 (album version); 3:39 (radio edit)
- Label: Konichiwa
- Songwriters: Robyn; Patrik Berger
- Producer: Patrik Berger

Robyn singles chronology
"The Girl and the Robot" (2009)	"Dancing on My Own" (2010)	"Hang with Me" (2010)

Music video
- "Dancing on My Own" on YouTube

"Dancing on My Own" is a song by Swedish singer-songwriter Robyn, released on 20 April 2010 as the lead single from her fifth studio album, Body Talk Pt. 1 (2010), the first in her Body Talk series. "Dancing on My Own" was produced by Patrik Berger, co-produced by Robyn, and mixed by Niklas Flyckt, with Robyn and Patrik sharing writing credits. The song's stark mid-tempo electropop version from her album was the first version of the single released followed by a layered mid-tempo synth-pop edit designed for radio and a downtempo piano ballad recording for Radio 1's Live Lounge – Volume 5 later that year. It depicts a female protagonist in a crowded club just before last call who is dancing on her own while watching her ex-boyfriend, who she sought out, dancing with and embracing another woman, pondering confronting him for the last time before her time runs out. The song was inspired by situations Robyn observed while on her previous tour then clubbing throughout Stockholm, her favorite "inherently sad gay disco anthems", and the dissolution of her engagement.

Critics praised "Dancing on My Own" as another bittersweet anthem for her song canon, with some ranking it as the greatest song of the year and eventually, the decade. Several reassessed its influence as Robyn's signature song, a gay anthem, and "the ultimate sad banger" of the poptimist movement, with Rolling Stone ranking her original album version at number 20 on their list of the 500 Greatest Songs of All Time in 2021. "Dancing on My Own" became Robyn's first number one in her native country following its live premiere on Swedish TV show Sommarkrysset and also reached the top ten in Denmark, Norway and the United Kingdom later that month. Frequent collaborator Max Vitali directed "Dancing on My Own"'s Rosie Perez-inspired music video, first released on 21 May 2010, that showed Robyn portraying the protagonist in the song's lyrics in various club and rehearsal settings. The song later earned a nomination for Best Dance Recording at the 53rd Annual Grammy Awards and was awarded Best Song at the Grammisgalan in Sweden. All three of her song's versions were promoted well into the following decade through multiple televised and streamed live performances and inclusion on many films, television series, and commercials, particularly the HBO series Girls.

"Dancing on My Own" has been covered by numerous artists and bands, with several releases based on Robyn's downtempo version. Inspired by Kings of Leon's downbeat Southern rock ballad cover, performed live in concert but not recorded, an AC ballad by Britain's Got Talent contestant Calum Scott was released on 15 April 2016. Scott's cover was a moderate sleeper hit throughout Europe following substantial success in the UK, where it went viral on streaming services despite little initial radio play. Critical reception was polarized, with Robyn praising the cover but prominent music journalists comparing it negatively to her original. In 2026, a cover by singer-songwriter Malcolm Todd was prominently featured in a marketing campaign for clothing retailer Gap.

== Background and creation ==
Deep into sessions one "dark" week of November 2009 in Stockholm with longtime collaborator Klas Åhlund, Robyn's "stormy" engagement to Swedish MMA fighter and contemporary visual artist Olof Inger was starting to fray. "Tired of the broken heart", Robyn returned to writing about "sad love", a theme that remained prevalent in her work because it was universal, yet continued to give her fresh ideas. After launching her own pop-up club series in Hornstull Beach, Söder in January 2010, Konichiwa Bitches goes Tutti Frutti, modeled after Christian Falk's A Love Supreme, Robyn became inspired by DJing, clubbing and people-watching throughout Stockholm. Recalling how much the "dance world" had changed during the five years she spent promoting Robyn (2005), especially in America, Robyn realized it was finally ripe for exploitation: "It's really going to have its time now and not just be looked upon as kitsch." Conceptualizing club culture, Robyn created narratives for past patrons she had seen from situations she had witnessed, including their "expectations" for the night to "meet that person", reach a "good high", or experience "some kind of emotion", revisiting stories from Olof on his time as a doorman describing how they'd act then reminiscing on her time in New York City in 1997 promoting Robyn Is Here as a "lonely misfit teenager shoulder-shimmying alone in a gloomy corner" on Club Vinyl's "last ever" Saturday night and Sunday afternoon, The Shelter, and the "near mythological" Body&SOUL, respectively. Robyn came to see clubs as "an important place for our generation—almost like a church or a place where we go to experience something that's bigger than ourselves", feeling it wasn't just "cool" but "important", and even "utopian", that "in the middle of all these other people doing the same thing" she could dance in her "own space" on her "own terms", wanting "to make a song called 'Dancing On My Own'" but still unsure "what it was going to be about". Following the example of the "inherently sad, gay disco anthems" she loved, including tracks by Donna Summer with Giorgio Moroder, Sylvester, Billy Idol's "Dancing with Myself" (1980), Ultravox's "Dancing with Tears in My Eyes" (1984), and Sheila E's "A Love Bizarre" (1985), the song's storyline eventually came to her, picturing "the god-awful feeling of a woman who is watching her ex get with someone new at a club".

"With an idea of a chorus in her mind," Robyn wanted to work further with Åhlund but couldn't stop "toying" with the song on her own, eventually reaching out to prior collaborator Patrik Berger for a "different perspective". Patrik had prepared for weeks before their first session at his Stockholm studio with a "slew of electronic beats and tracks for Robyn to write over". All of this was for naught as the first thing she said was, "Can we sit down and write a song on an acoustic guitar today? I'm so tired of writing over electronic beats and tracks." Their first result was an "acoustic 'campfire'" demo with three chords in the manner of a country song. The chorus came first quickly, followed by the chords and parts of the melody. After days of "fatten[ing]...up" that demo, the two of them realized "...they preferred the original and stripped it all back down" again. Patrik, facing pressure from Swedish music industry insiders "telling him what he should do" with the song, decided for the first time that "rather than following the pack", he'd write and produce the song "how he wanted to", following a new group of "sonic scholars" in the country breaking away from Max Martin's "school of pop". Swapping "the acoustic guitar for synthesizers with frayed edges and a beat that aimed for a TKO," Patrik went "raw and gritty", "aiming for a 'window' of song" that would capture its "commercial appeal without destroying" its "myster[y]".

With this third demo, entitled "Right Over Here", compared by Robyn and critics to Glasvegas' "Geraldine" (2008) and later heard in part in 2018 at the Red Bull Music Academy in New York, Robyn and Patrik had finally settled on a blueprint for the final track. A "lot of time" was spent subsequently on "the individual components of the song: the drums, the bass and the pounding staccato it starts with". Lyrically, Robyn and Patrik were "super picky" and took even longer. Obsessively trying to come up with the right words to not "sugar-coat the experience" of all of the "messy moments of rejection," they both wanted "uncomfortably honest" lyrics designed to have each phrase read like a "little poem". "Weeks" were spent "texting each other...on lines" with "a couple of days [spent] on each" that filled a "handful of notebooks" by the end, with one entirely "scrapped", as "every single word needed to feel right." Soon after completion of the song, Robyn became "conflicted" about having her collaborators and friends hear it. Recalling her excitement upon initially "sending the demo to the record label and telling them I thought we had a good single", its themes of "nostalgia and sentimentality" in retrospect came across like a "teenage version" of herself she was "happy to let go of". Robyn ended up deciding to include the song on Body Talk Pt. 1, working through "difficult" early promotion as the themes didn't "always feel true" to her.

Many years later Robyn and Patrik realized their leaps of faith with the song were worth it. After "taking a step back from what she'd created", working through "a lot of therapy" where she "worked on [...] and healed" herself, then felt the "song was talking back to her" when "thousands of fans" sang it back to her on her 2019 tour when she "cut the song just before the chorus", she realized the song had "moved on from its beginnings" and was no longer "conflicted" about "playing it live", feeling it had become "something that took on meaning for a lot of people in different ways". Meanwhile, Patrik was reaffirmed of his decision to break from Max Martin's formula despite "ang[er]" from many of his peers in Sweden, as it became "one of those songs where people came up to [him], talking about how much it mattered."

== Composition and release ==
Robyn – "Dancing on My Own"
A 28-second sample of the midtempo album version, featuring parts of the middle eight and chorus.

"Dancing on My Own" was composed by Robyn and Patrik Berger. Featuring "elements of 'many different worlds'" she loves that make her "proud" of the track, including "80s rock ballads" and "queer electronica", with the goal of releasing a record that would meet the standard of Prince, two versions of the midtempo ballad were released for the album then for radio, where "everything, bar Robyn's vocal, is electronic". A third, downtempo, 'pared down', piano-based version, recorded from her performance on 16 June 2010 on BBC Radio 1 was then released separately from the project on Radio 1's Live Lounge – Volume 5 on 22 October 2010. Both electronic versions keep a tempo of 117 beats per minute in common time, which NPR's Sam Sanders implies was arranged deliberately as it was "situated [...] pretty close to what scientists say is the preferred walking tempo for humans". All three versions are in the key of G♭ major, following an "immediately familiar one-five-four" chord progression of G♭5–D♭5–C♭5 and traditional ABABCB structure except for one pre-chorus line following its first verse and one outro line of a portion of its chorus following its choral refrain that concludes the song, with Robyn's vocals spanning from D♭_{4} to E♭_{5}.

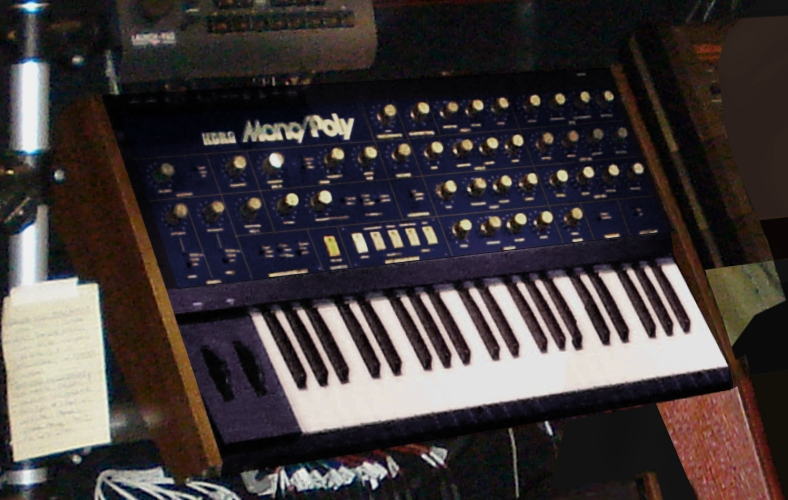
Korg Mono-Poly (MP-4) analog synthesizer

The "brutal", "direct", and "minimal" electropop album version, the first version of the song released, leaked on approximately 19 April, then was released as a digital single the next day, followed by its official release on 1 June 2010 as Body Talk Pt. 1's lead single. Its focus is on its "relentless jackhammer" "iconic throbbing bass backbone" synth, made using the Korg Mono/Poly (MP-4) analog synthesizer. That is followed by the use of a "kick drum" on beats "1 and 3" and a "snare" on beats "2 and 4", both of which last through the entire song, accented with "eight repeated, robotic, hihat quavers halfway through [beginning at 1:57], [...] little clave tinkles in the verses [1:36] and the odd crash cymbal". A "sad piano motif" accompanies the song's "middle 8", the "one moment in the track when you're allowed to pause", then "[at 2:45]...the pause is broken by 16 snare hits, all at maximum volume, with no crescendo or dynamic," followed by a return to the choral refrain that closes out the song. USC musicologist Nate Sloan highlighted the "miracle" of the "lyrics [...] sparseness" and the "six seconds of silence between each line in the verse" which he observed "wasn't a lot of time in the abstract" but "eons" on a pop song, which NPR's Sam Sanders felt Robyn left to let the listener "live in that space – to give you time to insert all of your emotions and stories and feelings into the seconds between the lines". The song's second synth-pop version, designed for radio and first heard accompanying its music video when it premiered on 21 May 2010, was released as a bonus track to Body Talk Pt. 1's iTunes release on 11 June 2010. It mixes those elements at substantially different levels and most noticeably adds "an extra arpeggiated synth through the intro and the verse". James Montgomery of MTV News described the radio version as "a computerized kaleidoscope of chippy, chiming blips and piston-like drums." Vanyaland's Michael Marotta pointed out a small bell effect resembling last call that rings at the climax of the song in both electronic versions' middle 8, interpreting its inclusion as an indication the protagonist's time had run out in her last effort to gain notice from the ex-lover.

Robyn's "love letter" to Stockholm as indicated in her "favorite lyric" describing its weather in winter, a "big black sky over [her] town", the song's "bittersweet, voyeuristic narrative" is of "a woman dancing alone in a crowded club while her ex and his new lover look on", with a deliberate "bait and switch" of production that sounds in its opening "life-affirming" but in reality is backing what the listener soon realizes is a "bleak, wounded" "breakup song" lyrically, a deliberate "juxtaposition" "of light and dark at the same time" whose "magic" Robyn explained to Kindness at Red Bull Music Academy is what she's "drawn to when [she] make[s] music", and is "much more satisfying" to her than just one feeling or the other, which she'd found "predictable" and "boring". NPR's Sam Sanders felt these contrasts of "female empowerment through angst" in "lesser hands [...] might be confusing" but "[w]hen Robyn does it, it's human." Outside its story of the "total outsider" in "love sickness" "in the middle of the club" who's still "going to take care of herself and have a good time even though she's pretty dramatic and crazy", she left the rest of its narrative up for interpretation, explaining to Z100's JJ Kincaid that revealing every detail wouldn't have been "as interesting", preferring writing that brings out "emotion[s]....in a way that enables the listener to [...] connect to [the song] in their own way".

== Music video ==
Robyn in Sandra Backlund knitted armour, located in rehearsal setting cut scene behind empty microphone stand

The music video for "Dancing on My Own" premiered via Robyn's official Vimeo account on 21 May 2010 and was released to YouTube on 28 May 2010, accompanied by its radio version. Directed by Max Vitali (who previously worked with Robyn on the second music video for her 2005 single "Be Mine!"), and choreographed by longtime collaborator Maria "Decida" Wahlberg, the music video was produced by Nils Ljunggren and HSI Productions, with filming by Erik Sohlstrom and editing by Johan Söderberg and Johan Wik. Wardrobe, hair, and makeup were done by Naomi Itkes, Ali Pirzadeh and Linda Öhrström, respectively.

According to Robyn, Max, and 'Decida' from a behind-the-scenes black-and-white preview posted to Robyn's website the day before its release, it's meant to be a visually "simple" yet "still...atmospher[ic]" "performance video" aesthetically connected to her then "upcoming gigs and tour" that depicts "being sad on a dancefloor" in a "rave" or club" where other "people are dancing" and Robyn's choreography is meant to "[bring] out" a "pissed off [...] energy". Robyn portrays the protagonist depicted in the song's lyrics while lip-syncing its lines in three scenes in the center of the club's dance floor, in a dark hallway of that club and in a separate "harshly lit rehearsal" setting. The microphone stand with no microphone in the latter setting BBC's Fraser McAlpine argued was a deliberate direction as a metaphor for the song's narrative. Robyn is occasionally watching her ex with another woman and trying to get his attention in both club settings prior to leaving – though not overtly, nor is there an obvious reference in the video as to who the ex and his girlfriend are among the club goers.

'Decida' later explained to Billboard that "angry" choreography was inspired by "her own experiences as a teenager" channeling "Rosie Perez’s dance sequence in the opening credits to Do the Right Thing (1989)," while another choreographed moment of Robyn's "making out with yourself dance" where she turns "her back to the camera" and feigns intimacy with another person by "wrapping her arms around herself" was meant as a "moment of levity" from her "serious-faced" attempts to get her ex's attention, and she would continue to use both moves in subsequent live performances of the song. Reassessing her styling in the video with i-D years later, Robyn said she "loved" her wardrobes consisting of Philip Van De Roq jewellery chains attached to her ear and lapel, an altered Alexander Wang dress, and Sandra Backlund knitted armour, and only disliked her "hair", which she found "ridiculous", thinking she "[wasn't] sure what we were thinking there!"

Ryan Dombal of Pitchfork wrote of the video, "When you're a star, sometimes all you need to do is put on a casually stylish outfit, gaze into a lens, move your limbs around in a rhythmic manner, and-- just like that-- a high-quality music video is born. Robyn is a star. And that's exactly what happens in this video." Leslie Simon of MTV Buzzworthy named it a "Video You Need To Know" and wrote, "Amid a sea of strobe lights and PDA-stricken couples, Robyn seems cautiously fed up with dancing solo. Sad. We'll dance with you, lady!" Jake Hall of Dazed saw the video's "stand-out moment" as accompanying the song's "hammering drums transition into the final chorus", when Robyn is shown "ruthlessly throwing punches as strobe lights frame her wounded aggression."

The music video was also the final one to be played on MTV Live before it shut down on December 31, 2025.

== Reception ==
=== Critical ===
"Dancing on My Own" received acclaim from music critics. Luke Lewis of NME praised it as "a comet-trail of sadness and exhilaration that's easily the equal of Robyn's breakthrough hit, 'With Every Heartbeat.' Fraser McAlpine of BBC Radio 1 was stunned at the about-face from the "fragile waif" displayed in that prior song, praising Robyn's "always [...] ready-packed" voice "with a whole world of pain and anguish", the song's "punishingly tough" production and new narrative, and her "toughness" which "lies in her ability to express total agony, and total assurance at the same time, via the medium of a plaintive chorus [...] " Nick Levine of Digital Spy lauded the "misty-eyed electro-disco tune" he similarly found "every bit as emotive" as her singles from Robyn, including "'Be Mine!' [...] If your bottom lip's not quivering like the bassline by the time the second chorus hits, you've taken waaay too many mood stabilisers [...] " Pitchfork's Ryan Dombal appreciated it showed "the scuffs on her scepter" in comparison to her promotional singles from Body Talk Pt. 1, awarding it their famous "Best New Music" label the day of release, and the outlet's Tom Breihan during its promotion would deem it her "Euro-pop masterpiece." The Guardian's Michael Hann stated that song's "pulsing synths and electronic percussion manage to sound both jackbooted and ineffably melancholy." Jer Fairall wrote for PopMatters that "[t]he aggressive stun-gun rhythm of 'Dancing On My Own' can't hide a classic drama-played-out-on-the-dancefloor scenario inherited from standard bearers like ABBA's 'Dancing Queen' and Madonna's 'Into the Groove', nor is it cold enough not to melt at the touch of Robyn's warm, yearning vocals or the song's shimmering keyboard chime."

Slant Magazine named "Dancing on My Own" the best song of 2010, writing: "Few artists risk Robyn's emotional nakedness, and with 'Dancing on My Own' she reveals the exquisite flipside to her more empowered 'With Every Heartbeat'". The Guardian named it the best song of the year as well, writing: "'Dancing On My Own' is an extraordinary addition to Robyn's canon of skewed love songs; thoughtful and romantic enough for stuck-on-repeat listening, but with a pop sensibility that makes you want to head out in search of a dancefloor." Pitchfork named it the fourth best of 2010, saying that it "demonstrate[s] she is the Rocky Balboa of pop music." Rolling Stone named it the twenty-sixth best song of 2010, writing: "The Swedish diva spots her beloved with another girl – then turns her sadness into sparkling pop, perfect for solo freakouts." The song landed at number six on MTV's Best Songs of 2010, with James Montgomery writing: "as soon as 'Dancing' gets to that hair-raising build – a breathless rush of drums and adrenaline – you're no longer thinking about what Robyn's saying, really." In January 2011, the American music magazine The Village Voice's Pazz & Jop annual critics' poll ranked "Dancing on My Own" at number three to find the best music of 2010. The song was nominated at the 53rd Grammy Awards in the category Best Dance Recording, but lost to "Only Girl (In the World)" by Rihanna.

=== Commercial ===
"Dancing on My Own" debuted at number two on the Sverigetopplistan chart on the issue dated 11 June 2010. The song ascended and descended between number two and number three over its first seven weeks, before reaching the top position on the issue dated 30 July 2010 where it remained for two weeks. The song became Robyn's first number one on the chart, as well as her seventh top-ten hit. It spent 18 consecutive weeks in the top ten and was present on the chart for a total of 40 weeks, finishing as the sixth best-selling song of 2010. In Denmark, "Dancing on My Own" debuted at number 33 on the issue dated 18 June 2010. After steadily ascending on the chart for several weeks, the song reached its peak of number two on the issue dated 6 August 2010. It has since then been certified platinum by the International Federation of the Phonographic Industry in Denmark for selling over 30,000 units. In Norway, the song debuted at number six, which became its peak.

The song peaked at number 22 on the European Hot 100 Singles chart, becoming her highest-peaking solo song on the chart. On the UK Singles Chart, it debuted and peaked at number eight on the issue dated 26 June 2010, immediately becoming Robyn's best charting single in the country since "With Every Heartbeat" in 2007. It also reached number three on the UK Dance Chart. In July 2026, "Dancing on My Own" surpassed the one million sales mark in the United Kingdom, with 1,003,469 units moved since the song's release. In the United States, "Dancing On My Own" debuted at number 40 on the Hot Dance Club Songs chart. On the issue dated 17 July 2010, it reached its peak of number three and stayed on that position for two weeks.

== Live performances ==
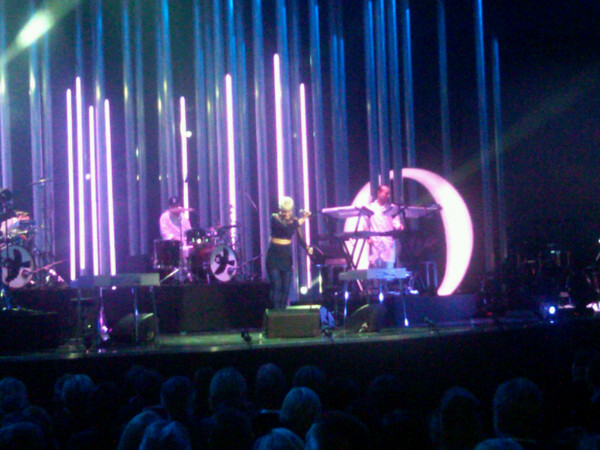
Robyn performing "Dancing on My Own" at the 2010 Nobel Peace Prize Concert

On 5 June 2010, Robyn gave her live premiere of the track's midtempo version for Sommarkrysset on TV4 at the Stora Scenen in Stockholm's Gröna Lund amusement park. On 16 June 2010 Robyn premiered the downtempo version of the track on BBC Radio 1's Live Lounge. The first live performance of the track on US television was on the Late Show with David Letterman on 19 July 2010. On 12 September 2010, Robyn performed a remix of the midtempo version with DJ deadmau5 at the 2010 MTV Video Music Awards, truncated by a commercial break. The two did not rehearse the performance until the morning of the show, and Robyn said, "I met him for, like, five minutes, and then we were playing." In 2010–2011, Robyn performed the song on other American television shows such as Late Night with Jimmy Fallon, The Tonight Show with Jay Leno, The Ellen DeGeneres Show Jimmy Kimmel Live! and Saturday Night Live. She also performed it at the 2010 Nobel Peace Prize Concert in Oslo, Norway.

On 17 January 2011, Robyn attended the Grammisgalan to accept the awards for Best Song (for "Dancing on My Own"), Best Album, Best Female Artist and Best Composer. On 15 March 2011 she performed the song along with "Fembot" and "With Every Heartbeat" at Studio Hamburg, Germany as part of a promotional mini-concert for Deutsche Telekom's Telekom Street Gigs, later broadcast on ProSieben's We Love In Concert series.

On 14 February 2025, Robyn performed the track live with David Byrne at the SNL 50 Homecoming Concert at Radio City Music Hall.

== Impact and legacy ==
Anticipation among several music journalists surrounding Robyn's social media announcement on 27 July 2018 of her first release of solo material in eight years, "Missing U", began a reassessment of the strength of her Body Talk series' "anchor", the original album version of "Dancing on My Own", and more broadly, its impact on other musical artists and the industry as a whole in the years that followed. In June 2018, Rolling Stone ranked that version of the song 19th on its list of 'The 100 Greatest Songs of the Century – So Far', in July 2018, NPR ranked it as the 49th greatest song by a female or nonbinary artist in the 21st century, and in October 2020, The Guardian's Alexis Petridis called it "the greatest pop single of the past 20 years". The track was considered the greatest of the decade by Rolling Stone, NME, Stereogum, Slant, Consequence, AP, Insider, Esquire, iNews, Vanyaland and Audiofemme. Time, NPR listeners, Paste, Good Housekeeping, The Interns and The Wild Honey Pie ranked it second, Pitchfork third, Elle and Treble fourth and USA Today ninth. Gorilla vs. Bear ranked it 12th, Crack Magazine 13th, NBHAP 15th, Uproxx 18th and Harper's Bazaar 22nd. In September 2021, Rolling Stone, from a poll of more than 250 artists, musicians, producers, critics, journalists and industry figures, ranked the original album version of Robyn's "Dancing on My Own" at number 20, between Billie Holiday's "Strange Fruit" and John Lennon's "Imagine", on their reissued list of "The 500 Greatest Songs of All Time", the decade's highest entry on their list.

Released at what Harper's Bazaar's Natalie Maher deemed "the height of the pop renaissance" of the late 2000s/early 2010s, several columnists thought it took a decade for the song's influence to be appreciated critically due to the sharp contrast with its initial commercial reception, a result of several factors including its tone and theme. "Seamlessly ushering dance music to the forefront of the pop continuum by making a record and a single that was easily adaptable to radio play but didn't alienate its raw emotions, delivering a certain edge and undeniable melancholia", it arrived "just when brainless EDM started taking off in the US", and as Treble's Jeff Terich observed, "the protagonist of every other pop hit from the early half of the decade [turned] a possible sexual encounter with a nightclub fling into the 'Most Important Moment on Earth,'" (and Robyn reminded us that "no, it doesn't always work out that way"). "Never touching the Hot 100" as Pitchfork's Ryan Dombal noted Fawbert saw it taking "another nine-and-a-half years" to reveal its impact over the course of the decade after "slowly unleashing its tentacles and hooking itself around the music world." The song "heralded the end of the glitzy, VIP-filled, champagne-drenched 'Club' era of songwriting" in Fawbert's view, and it "changed the trajectory of pop, indie and dance." Insider's Callie Ahlgrim wrote that the song "served as a lodestar for so much of this decade's pop" when "the best work of countless female pop stars" that followed "bears the mark of Robyn's signature poptimism". Ahlgrim said that, without Robyn's influence, there would be "no Carly Rae Jepsen, no Charli XCX, no Lorde." Max Martin's manager said that Martin thought "Dancing on My Own" was "one of the best pop songs ever made," and years later at a dinner he told her that he continued to have a "lot" of female artists come into his studio, "...put your album on the table," and say, "I wanna make this!" Robyn described his response as "Well, fuck you, go work with her then!" which she found "very sweet."

In October 2020 The Guardian's Alexis Petridis detailed the track's "brilliant electronic rebooting of the old disco trick whereby euphoric club music is paired with lyrical despair" and Pitchfork's Jamieson Cox saw a similar dynamic when comparing her output to fellow Swedes ABBA for a September 2019 retrospective of their iconic greatest hits compilation released in 1992, expressing that she "became one of this decade's great pop heroes by pinning down that same sad-ecstatic balance and welding it to modern, muscular production." NBHAP's Norman Fleischer also felt ABBA's anthem "Dancing Queen" had "finally found a proper successor" in Robyn's track. Seeing the domination over the music landscape by the close of the 2010s of this kind of song "whose instrumental sets you up for good times, only to sucker punch your heart with lyrics of Biblical sadness," BBC's Mark Savage solely credited Robyn and the single, arguing the "sad banger" had clearly "influenced an entire generation of songwriters." To that end, Lorde shared with Vice her "friendly fixation" with Robyn, including keeping a framed portrait of her on the piano during her performance of "Liability" on Saturday Night Live and in the studio as a "patron saint" to watch over the Melodrama sessions. Héloïse Letissier of Christine & the Queens, who presented Robyn with the award for Songwriter of the Decade, said that "as a songwriter I can only marvel at a song like 'Dancing On My Own' ...it's a gem of pop." Pop stars Charli XCX and Zara Larsson acknowledged Robyn's influence, with Charli XCX expressing that "Robyn has definitely been part of paving the way for pop stars who fall a little to the left of the Top 40 norm," and Larsson saying, "She's what I strive to be in a sense of making my own choices and staying true to myself."

Becoming what NME's Eli Hunt described as the "queen of the misfits," Robyn has been described as a gay icon because of the popularity of "Dancing on My Own", itself described as a gay anthem. Robyn said she "felt connected to the gay audience because there's an element to the culture that you have had to think about or make up your mind about what it is to be an outsider..." By the late 2010s out singer/songwriter Sam Smith expressed that they thought the track made Robyn "a huge part of the LGBTQ community because we get to dance our pain away." Rolling Stone ranked "Dancing on My Own" at number 20 on their list of "25 Essential LGBTQ Pride Songs", describing the song as "deeply resonant to queer, marginalized people."

== Formats and track listings ==
- Australia digital download
1. "Dancing on My Own" (Radio Version) – 4:39
2. "Dancing on My Own" (Rex the Dog Remix) – 6:25
- Germany/UK CD single
1. "Dancing on My Own" (Radio Edit) – 3:37
2. "Dancing on My Own" (Rex the Dog Extended Remix) – 7:28
- Germany digital EP
1. "Dancing on My Own" (Radio Edit) – 3:37
2. "Dancing on My Own" (Radio Version) – 4:36
3. "Dancing on My Own" (Buzz Junkies Edit) – 4:06
4. "Dancing on My Own" (Album Edit) – 3:37
5. "Dancing on My Own" (Rex the Dog Remix) – 6:22
6. "Dancing on My Own" (Azzido Da Bass vs. Dirty Disco Youth Remix) – 5:52
7. "Dancing on My Own" (Jakwob Remix) – 4:10
8. "Dancing on My Own" (Buzz Junkies Remix) – 5:57
- Germany digital EP – Part 2
1. "Dancing on My Own" (Michael Woods Remix Edit) – 4:43
2. "Dancing on My Own" (Michael Woods Remix) – 7:45
3. "Dancing on My Own" (Michael Woods Remix Instrumental) – 7:46
4. "Dancing on My Own" (Jakwob Remix) – 4:10
5. "Dancing on My Own" (Fred Falke Radio Edit) – 4:21
6. "Dancing on My Own" (Fred Falke Remix) – 7:30
7. "Dancing on My Own" (Fred Falke Instrumental) – 7:30
8. "Dancing on My Own" (Rex the Dog Extended Remix) – 7:28
- Sweden/US digital download
1. "Dancing on My Own" – 4:48
- Sweden digital EP – Remixes
1. "Dancing on My Own" (Fred Falke Remix) – 7:30
2. "Dancing on My Own" (Jakwob Remix) – 4:10
3. "Dancing on My Own" (Michael Woods Remix) – 7:45
4. "Dancing on My Own" (Chew Fu Remix) – 5:05
5. "Dancing on My Own" (Rex the Dog Remix) – 6:25
- UK digital EP
1. "Dancing on My Own" (Radio Version) – 4:39
2. "Dancing on My Own" (Rex the Dog Remix) – 6:25
3. "Dancing on My Own" (Buzz Junkies Remix) – 6:00
4. "Dancing on My Own" (Jakwob Remix) – 4:10
5. "Dancing on My Own" (Azzido Da Bass vs. Dirty Disco Youth Remix) – 5:51
6. "Dancing on My Own" (Fred Falke Remix) – 7:30
7. "Dancing on My Own" (Michael Woods Remix) – 7:45
- US digital EP – Remixes
1. "Dancing on My Own" (Michael Woods Remix Edit) – 4:42
2. "Dancing on My Own" (Michael Woods Remix) – 7:44
3. "Dancing on My Own" (Fred Falke Remix) – 7:30
4. "Dancing on My Own" (Jakwob Remix) – 4:09
5. "Dancing on My Own" (Rex the Dog Extended Remix) – 7:27
6. "Dancing on My Own" (Rex the Dog Remix Edit) – 3:24
7. "Dancing on My Own" (Buzz Junkies Remix) – 5:59

== Credits and personnel ==
The liner notes of the album Body Talk Pt. 1 provide the following credits:

- Robyn – music, lyrics, co-production, instruments, programming
- Patrik Berger – music, lyrics, production, instruments, programming
- Niklas Flyckt – mixing

== Charts ==
=== Weekly charts ===
Chart (2010–2015)	Peak position
Australia Dance (ARIA)	23
Belgium (Ultratop 50 Flanders)	25
Denmark (Tracklisten)	2
European Hot 100 Singles (Billboard)	22
Germany (GfK)	67
Ireland (IRMA)	82
Israel International Airplay (Media Forest)	9
Norway (VG-lista)	6
Scottish Singles Sales (Official Charts)	5
Slovakia Airplay (ČNS IFPI)	62
Sweden (Sverigetopplistan)	1
UK Dance (Official Charts)	3
UK Singles (Official Charts)	8
US Bubbling Under Hot 100 (Billboard)	13
US Dance Club Songs (Billboard)	3

Chart (2026)	Peak position
Australia On Replay Singles (ARIA)	45
Global 200 (Billboard)	176
Ireland (IRMA)	35
UK Dance (Official Charts)	9
UK Singles (Official Charts)	34

=== Year-end charts ===
Chart (2010)	Position
Denmark (Tracklisten)	20
Sweden (Sverigetopplistan)	6
UK Singles (OCC)	195
US Dance/Electronic Digital Song Sales (Billboard)	41

== Certifications ==
Region	Certification	Certified units/sales
Brazil (Pro-Música Brasil)	Gold	30,000^{‡}
Denmark (IFPI Danmark)	Platinum	30,000^{^}
New Zealand (RMNZ)	Platinum	30,000^{‡}
United Kingdom (BPI)	Platinum	1,003,469
United States (RIAA)	Platinum	1,000,000^{‡}
^{^} Shipments figures based on certification alone.^{‡} Sales+streaming figures based on certification alone.

== Calum Scott version ==
"Dancing on My Own"

Single by Calum Scott

from the album Only Human
- Released: 15 April 2016
- Recorded: 2016
- Genre: Adult contemporary; pop
- Length: 4:20
- Label: WMG, Capitol
- Songwriters: Robyn; Patrik Berger
- Producer: John McIntyre

Calum Scott singles chronology
"Dancing on My Own" (2016)	"Rhythm Inside" (2016)

Music video
- "Dancing on My Own" on YouTube

Before he became famous, British singer Calum Scott posted a cover version to his personal YouTube channel on 1 March 2014, and later performed the song for his audition on Britain's Got Talent in April 2015, the original clip of which has garnered over 415 million YouTube views. "Naive about the [music] industry" and worried his "career was over" after he wasn't signed to Simon Cowell's Syco Entertainment when "the show was over and it went quiet", Scott thought his "opportunity was gone". Tracking the data behind the sudden rise in engagement and speed of new subscribers to Scott's channel over several months, A&R executive Conrad Withey encouraged him to release the song officially. With Conrad's endorsement, Scott signed independently with Warner Music Group, and the song was released as his debut solo single on 15 April 2016, with a 3 June 2016 release in other territories under Capitol Records.

With this early exposure, Conrad's Instrumental, a London-based AI algorithm-based A&R start-up looking to streamline "notoriously inefficient methods of talent discovery" using internet engagement to cut costs with a "data-driven" platform that would controversially prioritize "popular[ity]" over "artistry" in support of "online engagement", "internet stars" and "brand and content partnerships" rather than "musicians", reversing preconceived notions of building fanbases from scratch by capitalizing on those that already existed, went on to contract their services with the 'Big 3' and revolutionize A&R signing of artists.

Scott's cover was noted for its "soft focus", with critical reception being polarized, and streaming performance being very strong in the UK and Australia, followed by sleeper hit longevity throughout Europe. Two EDM remixes of the cover were commissioned and released by Scott's label from Tiësto on 15 July 2016 and Hull-based Ben Dooks on 29 October 2018. Different music videos were commissioned and released later in 2016 for Scott's cover as well as the Tiësto remix.

=== Critical reception ===
Reception to Scott's cover was polarized. Metro Weekly's Sean Maunier called it a "stellar" confessional, noting its "subtle yet powerful" slight lyric changes to "reflect his own experience as a gay man" that were "casual" yet still "matter-of-fact, and all the more striking for it," Ones to Watch's Miro Sarkissian praised it as "stunning", and Digital Journal's Markos Papadatos found it "crisp and haunting". BBC Newsbeat's Steve Holden wrote that Scott's "second lease of life" he gave the song reached "a far wider audience in the mid-2010s", and Robyn shared with Steve she was "super happy" for Scott's success that got people to "know the song a little bit more", praising his "voice" and "interpretation [...] in a way that 'made the song come alive again.'"

On the other hand, both Noisey's Grace Medford and Dazed's Jake Hall wrote lengthy editorials harshly comparing Scott's cover to Robyn's original. The Guardian's Alexis Petridis likewise felt his cover "gormlessly sandblasted away the original's emotional complexity – a very realistic mix of despair, steely determination and euphoria – in favour of mournful bloke-at-a-piano emoting" and Pitchfork's Jayson Greene also found it "dubious" and "weepy" in comparison to Robyn's.

Tiësto's remix of Scott's cover also had a polarized reception. USA Today's Bryan Kalbrosky dismissed it outright as "inferior", arguing there was simply "no reason to listen" to it "so long as Robyn’s [original] exists" while We Rave You's Petar Lazarevic appreciated how Tiësto "slowly envelope[d]" yet still left "plenty of room" for Scott's vocals, building "the presence of the glossy guitar riffs in the drop" which evoked "the lazy and comfortable feelings that accompany the early hours of the morning after a fantastic night".

In March 2018, Scott revisited the mixed reactions to his version. He said that those complaining he had ruined Robyn's song were counterbalanced by positive responses, for instance one person that had "just written to me and said that they've come out to their family because of my interpretation". He said he "didn't change the pronouns of the song" because he wanted the interpretation to always come from a "gay man's perspective". He said the gay community have thanked him repeatedly for the song, saying "how much it means to them that they have a voice in music."

=== Chart performance ===
The cover went viral on streaming services, with Spotify tracking it reaching number one in six countries while ranking in the Top 10 in over 20, peaking at number 2 in the Global Viral 50. On iTunes it charted in the top ten in more than 12 countries. The track had its greatest reception in the UK, where, despite little radio airplay (apart from West Hull FM), it climbed into the top 40 and slowly reached number 4 in July. It was then added to BBC Radio 2's C List playlist and peaked at number 2 on the UK Singles Chart on 5 August. The track remained in the top three four months after its release and later that year it was revealed it was the most bought song of the summer in the country. Scott told the Official Charts Company on its reception there that he was "absolutely over the moon" at the news. The track went on to become the best-selling UK single by a British solo artist in 2016.

In the subsequent months and years, the track became a moderate sleeper hit in Europe, including by mid-2018 reaching 550M streams and becoming certified platinum in at least four countries. Scott said in a press statement upon signing with Capitol Records in the U.S. that "when I recorded the song in my bedroom, I never thought for a second that it would reach as far as it has and bring this level of support from literally all over the globe...I'm completely overwhelmed by it all."

=== Music videos ===
Scott in the crowd

Self-produced by Scott and directed by Ryan Pallotta, the video for the original version was released on 15 June 2016. A crowd of silent people dressed in white are looking towards a light source. Among them, Scott mouths the song lyrics. A man and a woman move through the crowd to find each other. By April 2020 the video had received over 400 million YouTube views.

Haley Fitzgerald and Josh Killacky dance in the Tiësto remix

The official video for the Tiësto remix was commissioned by Capitol Records and released on 4 October 2016. Co-directed by Josh Killacky and David Moore, and edited by Alex Ditommaso, the video depicts a man pursuing a woman who is no longer his lover. With Moore shooting video while riding a hoverboard in a stark studio space, Josh Killacky and Haley Fitzgerald perform a modern dance routine, choreographed by Killacky.

=== Media ===
The cover aired on the 20th episode, "Kill 'em All" of The CW series The Vampire Diaries, broadcast 29 April 2016, while Caroline makes soup for Bonnie while ranting to Alaric about Stefan, commitment and closure. It also aired on the 24th episode, "Ring of Fire" of the ABC series Grey's Anatomy, broadcast 17 May 2017, while Nathan asks Meredith details about Megan, then hugs her in celebration and drives off. Scott promoted the track throughout 2016 and 2017 most notably on Late Night with Seth Meyers, Good Morning America, Elvis Duran and the Morning Show, Good Morning Britain, The Ellen DeGeneres Show, and Dancing with the Stars. Following the 10th episode "Brainwave Jr." of the DC Universe series Stargirl in July 2020, the cover "racked up 10.5 million U.S. on-demand streams, along with 3,000 digital downloads, according to Nielsen Music/MRC Data", topping The Hollywood Reporter's Top TV Songs Chart. During the 2021 MLB postseason, the Boston Red Sox adopted the Tiësto remix of the song as their postseason anthem, playing the song in their celebrations after their Wild Card Game win over their rivals, the New York Yankees, and their series win over the Tampa Bay Rays. During the 2022 MLB postseason, the Philadelphia Phillies also adopted the Tiësto remix of the song as their own postseason anthem, with the team carrying it over into the 2023 season as well. The song was prominently featured in the Netflix movie Voicemails for Isabelle as the favorite song of "Izzy" Isabelle and her sister Jill.

=== Awards and nominations ===
Year	Award	Category	Result
2017	Brit Awards	British Single of the Year	Nominated

=== Weekly charts ===
Chart (2016–2017)	Peak position
Australia (ARIA)	2
Austria (Ö3 Austria Top 40)	32
Belgium (Ultratop 50 Flanders)	19
Belgium (Ultratop 50 Wallonia)	30
Canada Hot 100 (Billboard)	41
Canada AC (Billboard)	35
Canada Hot AC (Billboard)	37
Denmark (Tracklisten)	8
France (SNEP)	58
Germany (GfK)	61
Ireland (IRMA)	4
Netherlands (Dutch Top 40)	7
Netherlands (Single Top 100)	14
Mexico Airplay (Billboard)	28
Mexico Ingles Airplay (Billboard)	1
New Zealand (Recorded Music NZ)	5
Portugal (AFP)	5
Scottish Singles Sales (Official Charts)	1
Sweden (Sverigetopplistan)	4
Switzerland (Schweizer Hitparade)	81
UK Singles (Official Charts)	2
UK Independent (Official Charts)	2
US Billboard Hot 100	93
US Adult Contemporary (Billboard)	15
US Adult Pop Airplay (Billboard)	25
US Dance Club Songs (Billboard)	14
US Pop Airplay (Billboard)	35

=== Year-end charts ===
Chart (2016)	Position
Australia (ARIA)	21
Denmark (Tracklisten)	87
Netherlands (Dutch Top 40)	84
Sweden (Sverigetopplistan)	59
UK Singles (Official Charts Company)	12
Chart (2017)	Position
Denmark (Tracklisten)	88
Netherlands (Dutch Top 40)	67
Netherlands (Single Top 100)	92
Portugal Full Track Download (AFP)	40
US Adult Contemporary (Billboard)	42
Chart (2018)	Position
Portugal Full Track Download (AFP)	182
Chart (2021)	Position
Australia (ARIA)	100

=== Decade-end charts ===
Chart (2010–2019)	Position
Australia (ARIA)	66
UK Singles (Official Charts Company)	54

=== Certifications ===
Region	Certification	Certified units/sales
Australia (ARIA)	15× Platinum	1,050,000^{‡}
Belgium (BRMA)	Gold	10,000^{‡}
Brazil (Pro-Música Brasil)	3× Platinum	180,000^{‡}
Canada (Music Canada)	9× Platinum	720,000^{‡}
Denmark (IFPI Danmark)	5× Platinum	450,000^{‡}
France (SNEP)	Gold	100,000^{‡}
Germany (BVMI)	3× Gold	600,000^{‡}
Italy (FIMI)	Platinum	50,000^{‡}
Mexico (AMPROFON)	Gold	30,000^{‡}
Netherlands (NVPI)	Gold	20,000^{‡}
New Zealand (RMNZ)	9× Platinum	270,000^{‡}
Norway (IFPI Norway)	2× Platinum	120,000^{‡}
Poland (ZPAV)	Platinum	50,000^{‡}
Portugal (AFP)	3× Platinum	30,000^{‡}
Spain (Promusicae)	Platinum	60,000^{‡}
United Kingdom (BPI)	6× Platinum	3,600,000^{‡}
United States (RIAA)	3× Platinum	3,000,000^{‡}
Streaming
Sweden (GLF)	4× Platinum	32,000,000^{†}
^{‡} Sales+streaming figures based on certification alone.^{†} Streaming-only figures based on certification alone.

== Release history ==
Release dates and formats for "Dancing on My Own"
Region	Date	Format	Label(s)	Ref.
United States	November 2, 2010	Mainstream airplay	Interscope	

== Other versions ==
Belgian singer Kato Callebaut performed Robyn's downtempo version as part of her audition on Idool 2011 then released her studio cover, receiving a gold certification for 10,000+ copies sold. American rock band Kings of Leon performed but never officially released a cover of Robyn's ballad during a session on Zane Lowe's show on BBC Radio 1. The cover was officially posted by the show to their YouTube channel on 10 September 2013, which Billboard's Jason Lipshutz described as an "injection" of Kings of Leon's "muscular Southern rock stylings" with "meaty guitar riffs", with "Caleb Followill's signature growl in full effect" and the "'Whoa-oh-oh's' echo on the chorus", recalling the singer's "epic "Use Somebody" flare-ups". Instinct's Jeremy Hinks slammed it as "nails on a chalkboard," while Spin's Marc Hogan praised it as "disarmingly effective" and having brought out Robyn's "smart songwriting", noting their connection to her "deeply conflicted relationship with mainstream success".

American a cappella group Pentatonix released a cover of her mid-tempo version in July 2017 with a music video, presenting their first track as a quartet instead of a quintet. American actress Elle Fanning performed the mid-tempo version as the character Violet in the film Teen Spirit, released in September 2018, and her recording, described as "unassuming" yet "impressive" by MTV, was subsequently released in April 2019 as part of its soundtrack with a promotional music video depicting her role, aiming for pop stardom. Singer/songwriter Kelly Clarkson covered the downtempo version on 28 February 2019 in Dallas, Texas, on her Meaning of Life Tour. Robyn went on to tell Newsbeat in 2020 that she "really liked" Kelly's version, noting "she has a really powerful voice. She recorded one of my favorite Max Martin songs, "Since U Been Gone", which I covered in the Radio 1 Live Lounge. So that's funny."

Alternative rock band Grouplove released an indie pop cover of the midtempo version in March 2020, described as "electric" and "passionate" by Flood Magazine, promoting it on Cover Nation, SiriusXM and ALT 98.7. American folk singer Willie Watson, former founding member of Americana and bluegrass band Old Crow Medicine Show, released a folk version of the song in May 2020, dedicating it in a live stream performance of the song from his own studio to everyone "dancing on their own" amidst the COVID-19 pandemic. In December 2020 English singer/songwriter and model Karen Elson released a downtempo alternative country version on her EP, Radio Redhead, Vol.1. Los Angeles-based garage punk band the Regrettes released a cover of the midtempo version in March 2023. Tove Lo covered the song in October 2022 for Like a Version on Australian radio station Triple J with the cover subsequently being released on the station's YouTube channel as well as music streaming services. Canadian alternative rock band Arkells covered the song in May 2024 on their album Disco Loadout, Volume I.

== See also ==
- List of highest-certified singles in Australia
