= No Matter What (Calum Scott song) =

Single by Calum Scott

from the album Only Human
- Released: 19 October 2018
- Length: 3:56
- Label: Capitol
- Songwriters: Scott; Toby Gad

Calum Scott singles chronology
"What I Miss Most" (2018)	"No Matter What" (2018)	"Undo" (2019)

Music video
- "No Matter What" on YouTube

"No Matter What" is a song recorded by British singer-songwriter Calum Scott for the special edition of his debut studio album, Only Human. It was released on 19 October 2018 as the album's fifth overall single and the first single from the special edition.

== Background ==
Scott describes "No Matter What" as his "most personal song" and the song he is "most proud of". The song tells the story of Scott telling his parents he was gay and their reactions of loving him "no matter what". Scott said "It was a song that I always had to write, and a song I never thought I'd be able to share. This song has so much bones behind it and has such a wider discussion, not only about sexuality but about acceptance." adding "This hopefully will be a movement. I want to help people, I want to inspire people, I want to make people more compassionate."

== Music video ==
The music video was released on 8 November 2018 on Scott's YouTube channel via Vevo. It was directed by Ozzie Pullin.

== Critical reception ==
Katrina Rees from CelebMix called the song "a stunning piano ballad" with lyrics that are "raw and extremely personal".

== Track listing ==
Digital download
No.	Title	Length
1.	"No Matter What"	3:56

== Charts ==
Chart (2018–2019)	Peak position
Australian Digital Tracks (ARIA)	10
Belgium (Ultratip Bubbling Under Flanders)	46
Canada AC (Billboard)	30
Scottish Singles Sales (Official Charts)	53

== Certifications ==
Region	Certification	Certified units/sales
Brazil (Pro-Música Brasil)	Gold	20,000^{‡}
Canada (Music Canada)	Gold	40,000^{‡}
Portugal (AFP)	Gold	5,000^{‡}
^{‡} Sales+streaming figures based on certification alone.

== Release history ==
Region	Date	Format	Label	Ref.
Various	19 October 2018	Digital download, streaming	Capitol	
