= Calum Scott =

English singer and songwriter (born 1988)

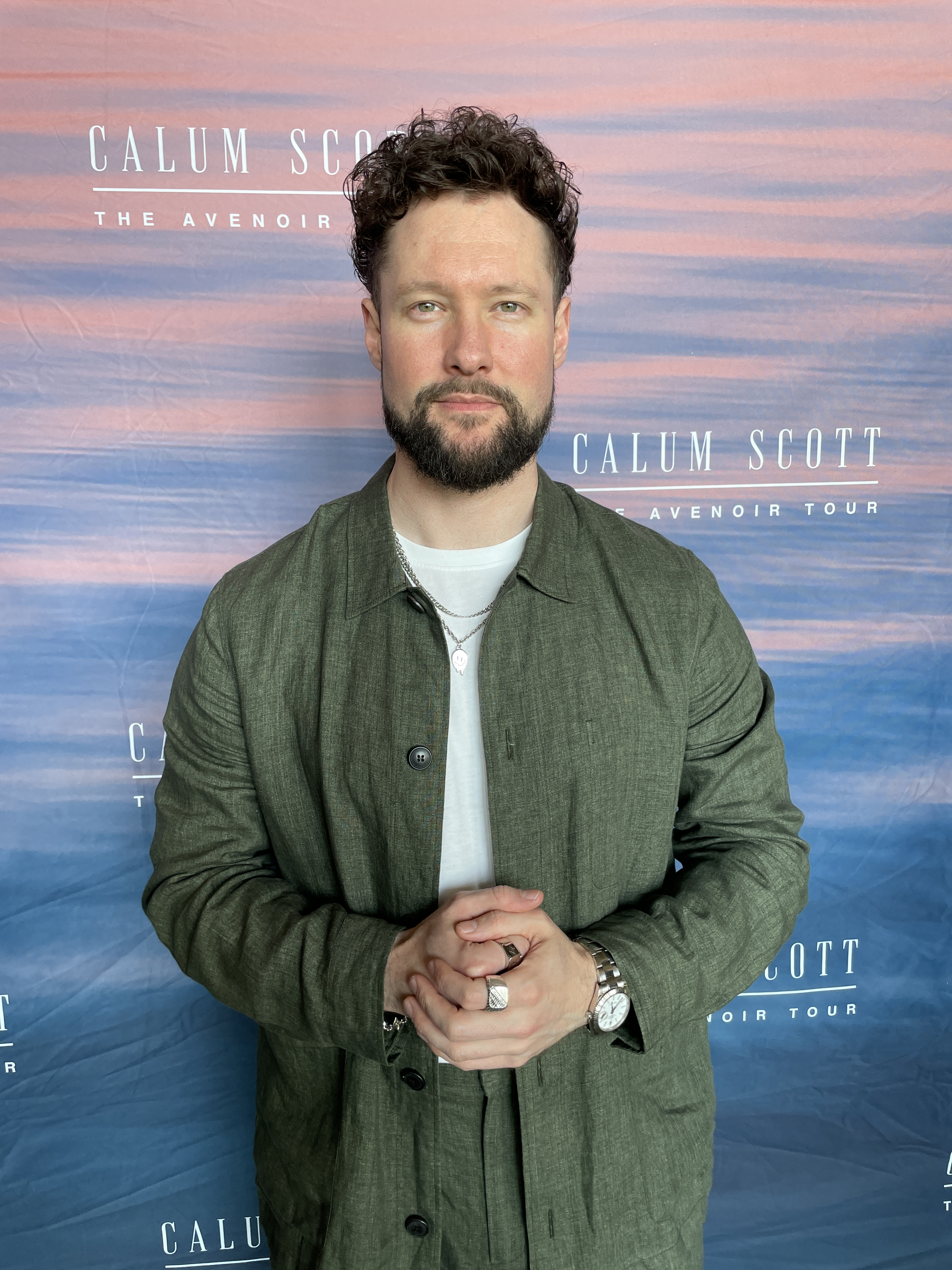
- Scott in 2026
- Born: 12 October 1988 (age 38); Beverley, East Riding of Yorkshire, England
- Occupations: Singer; songwriter
- Years active: 2011–present
- Musical career
- Origin: Kingston upon Hull, Yorkshire, England
- Genre: Pop
- Instruments: Vocals; piano; guitar; drums
- Labels: Capitol; EMI
- Website: calumscott.com

Calum Scott (born 12 October 1988) is an English singer and songwriter. He rose to prominence in April 2015 after competing on the ITV talent contest Britain's Got Talent, where he performed a cover of Robyn's hit "Dancing on My Own" and earned a Golden Buzzer from Simon Cowell. After placing sixth in the contest, he released his own version of the song as a single the following year, which peaked at number two on the UK singles chart and became Britain's best-selling single of summer 2016.

Scott later signed with Capitol and in 2017, released the single "You Are the Reason", which amassed more than one billion views on YouTube. His debut album, Only Human, followed in 2018 and reached number four on the UK Albums Chart. Scott achieved his second UK top five single with "Where Are You Now", a 2021 collaboration with Lost Frequencies.

== Early life ==
Calum Scott was born in Beverley, East Riding of Yorkshire to Debbie Burton and Kevin Scott, and grew up in the Yorkshire area, mainly in North Ferriby and Kingston upon Hull. His parents split up when he was two years old and his father moved to Canada. He has a younger sister, Jade, who is also a singer. Scott played the drums and his sister later encouraged him to sing. Prior to his fame, he worked in human resources.

== Career ==
=== 2011–2015: Career beginning and Britain's Got Talent ===
On 4 March 2011, Scott won the talent competition Mail's Star Search, organised by Hull Daily Mail. He then joined a Maroon 5 tribute band, Maroon 4, and toured around the United Kingdom. In 2014 he formed the electronic duo, The Experiment with John McIntyre. The debut single, "Girl (You're Beautiful)", was released on 14 June. The duo performed the song on Good Morning Britain and BBC Look North, but after, broke up.

On 11 April 2015, Scott's audition for the ninth series of Britain's Got Talent was broadcast on ITV. Just before his audition, his sister Jade also auditioned but was stopped early on both of her songs by Simon Cowell. Jade received four "No" votes from David Walliams, Amanda Holden, Simon Cowell and Alesha Dixon.

Even while having nerves and perhaps being anxious while seeing his sister not being advanced on the show, Calum performed a cover of Robyn's "Dancing on My Own", which he had heard Kings of Leon performing on BBC Radio 1's Live Lounge in 2013. After a standing ovation from the judging panel, Cowell pressed the Golden Buzzer giving Scott an automatic slot in the live shows. Cowell said:

"I've never, ever, in all the years I've done this show, heard a guy with the talent you've got. Seriously... the version was sensational and that shows to me that actually, you're more than a singer, you're an artist, and that's why you got that (the buzzer)."

After the audition, Scott received acclaim from stars such as Little Mix and Ashton Kutcher.

After his appearance on the show's first episode, his Twitter followers jumped from 400 to more than 25,000. The video of his audition has been viewed more than 400 million times on YouTube. In the semi-final on 29 May, Scott performed "We Don't Have to Take Our Clothes Off" by Jermaine Stewart. Walliams commented "You really sound like a recording artist", whilst Alesha Dixon suggested that he could have "success around the world". He won the semi-final with 25.6% of the vote, sending him straight through to the final. In the final on 31 May, Scott performed "Diamonds" by Rihanna and finished sixth out of 12 contestants with 8.2% of the vote. After Britain's Got Talent, Scott embarked on a series of shows around the United Kingdom, including Viking FM Future Star Awards, Flamingo Land Resort Fair, Westwood Cross Shopping Centre's tenth anniversary, Gibraltar Summer Nights, Hull Daily Mail's Star and Dartford Festival.

=== 2016–2018: Only Human ===
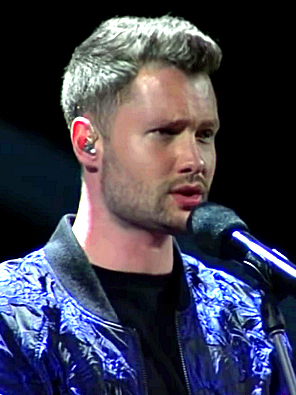
Scott at the Tabernacle, West London in June 2016

Scott released his cover of "Dancing on My Own" independently on 15 April 2016. It became a sleeper hit, first hitting number 40 in the charts in May and climbing into the top 40 despite little radio airplay apart from on West Hull FM. It was then added to Radio 2's "C List" and reached number two on the UK singles chart on 5 August. In August 2016, it was certified platinum in the UK, having sold more than 600,000 copies. Scott announced on Twitter on 24 May that he had signed a record deal with Capitol Records, where he was signed by A&R Executive Alex Wilhelm. Scott performed the song at television shows BBC Look North, Lorraine, Weekend, Late Night with Seth Meyers and Brazilian show Encontro com Fátima Bernardes. He also promoted the song on several radio stations, including BBC Radio Humberside, Viking FM, Radio Gibraltar, BFBS Radio and Gibraltar Broadcasting Corporation. On 16 September, he released the promotional single "Transformar" with Brazilian recording artist Ivete Sangalo as the official song of the 2016 Summer Paralympics in Rio de Janeiro; they performed the song at the closing ceremony on 18 September. It was revealed in September 2016 that "Dancing on My Own" was the most downloaded song of the summer in the UK. In autumn 2022, "Dancing on My Own" had a sudden resurgence in popularity owing to the Philadelphia Phillies players and fans embracing the dance mix version of the song during the team's run to the 2022 World Series.

In 2017, he toured the US and released the single "You Are the Reason". Also in 2017, he began working on his debut album, Only Human, which was released on 9 March 2018. A new version of "You Are the Reason" was released ahead of the album in early 2018 as a collaboration with Leona Lewis, and was performed by the two on The One Show in February 2018. In May, Scott released "What I Miss Most" as the fourth single from Only Human.

In October 2018, Scott released a new single titled "No Matter What". Upon release, Scott said:

"'No Matter What' is without question the most personal song I have ever written and the one I am most proud of. It's a song born from loneliness, acceptance and the heartbreaking but liberating tale of my coming out experience. What I love about this song is that it isn't just limited to a story of sexual identity, but about the relationship between parent and child and acceptance as a whole. This song didn't make my debut album because I simply wasn't ready at that time to give it to the world."

=== 2019–2022: Bridges ===
In September 2020, Scott partnered with American watch company Bulova on the development of a music documentary series titled Minutes with Calum, which explores the creative process behind his upcoming second album through the lens of Bulova.

In March 2021, Scott digitally released his first EP, titled Only Acoustic, which featured acoustic renditions of songs from his debut album. The following month, he released two more EPs; Only Collabs and Only Love. On 11 June 2021, Scott released the single "Biblical", the first song from his upcoming second album. He released the second song titled "Rise" on 1 October 2021, and the third song titled "If You Ever Change Your Mind" on 4 February 2022. On 29 April 2022, Scott announced that his second album, Bridges, would be released on 17 June 2022. On the same day, he released the fourth song, "Heaven", from the album. In July 2021, Scott collaborated with Belgian artist Lost Frequencies singing on a song titled "Where Are You Now", which was released on 30 July 2021. In early February 2022, the song reached the top 10 of the UK singles chart, becoming Scott's second song to reach the UK top 10. In November 2021, Scott collaborated with Brazilian recording artist Bryan Behr, singing on the song "Da Primeira Vez (From the First Time)". Scott sang in both English and Portuguese. Also in November 2021, he collaborated with British singer Jasmine Thompson on a song titled "Love Is Just a Word".

=== 2023–present: Collaborations and Avenoir ===
In February 2023, Scott collaborated with GRAMMY-nominated producer, DJ and record label executive Jax Jones on a song titled "Whistle", which was released on 10 February 2023, and entered the UK singles chart at number 14. Scott performed the track live at the BAFTA Film Awards.

Scott performed live with Take That on 7 May 2023 at the Coronation Concert in the grounds of Windsor Castle. Scott and Take That later worked with Robin Schulz and released an official reworking of "Greatest Day", with the song entering the UK singles downloads chart at number 7.

On 18 August 2023, Scott released the single "At Your Worst", and made its debut at number 20 on the UK singles downloads chart a week later. Upon the release of the song, Scott shared;

"This could be a song reassuring someone that you'll love them no matter what, but it's also a song to yourself: a reminder that you should love yourself at your worst because self-love is the most important. The sound on this one feels nostalgic and retro to me — kind of takes me back to my Sega Mega Drive. I'm excited to share new music with my fans and show everyone what I've been working on!"

In late 2023, Scott confirmed he was working on production for his third album, and will involve longtime collaborator Jon Maguire as executive producer.

On 29 January 2024, Scott released the second single from his third album, "Lighthouse", which received positive reviews. The song peaked at number 38 on the Official Singles Downloads Chart, and reached number 16 on the British Songs iTunes Chart on its release day.

Scott was due to headline the Live from The Yard music festival at Zebedee's Yard in Hull on 8 August 2024; however, this performance was cancelled owing to "circumstances beyond the control" of Scott and the organisers. The other acts at the festival went ahead and included performances from Ocean Colour Scene, Embrace and Cast. Scott's performance was rearranged for 9 August 2025.

On 27 January 2024, Scott served as a support act for Ed Sheeran's Mathematics Tour, first performing across Asia for three months, and later in Europe for the summer. In December 2024, Scott stated in an interview with Songwriter Universe that the six-month tour contributed to the album's extended production timeline.

On 12 July 2024, Scott released his third single, a pop driven track titled "Roots", which critics described as an energetic and optimistic pop anthem, with one review noting its "mesmerizing track" and "dance euphoria". The song reached number 20 on the UK's Official Singles Downloads Chart. The fourth single, "My World", was released on 4 October 2024. It peaked at number 26 on the Official Singles Downloads Chart. On 4 April 2025, Scott released his next single, "God Knows", alongside the announcement of the title of his third album, Avenoir, due to be released originally on 12 September. Scott noted on social media that the album was his "most confident work yet". His next single, "Die for You", was released on 26 May. Scott also announced the North American leg of his Avenoir Tour, scheduled for 2026. On 19 August 2025, it was announced that Scott would be featured as a coach on the fifteenth season of The Voice of Germany, on the "Comeback Stage". On 12 September 2025 (the original release date for the third album), Scott released a re-imagined ballad duet of "I Wanna Dance with Somebody (Who Loves Me)" featuring Whitney Houston's original vocal stems. The collaboration received approval from Houston's estate. It entered the UK singles chart update at number 93. The third album, Avenoir, was released on 10 October, and entered the charts at number 31. On 31 December 2025, Scott performed with Irish singer Ronan Keating on the latter's BBC One New Year's Eve programme, Ronan Keating and Friends: A New Year's Eve Party.

On 20 February 2026, Scott released a reworked version of Avenoir track "Unsteady", featuring rapper Aitch.

== Personal life ==
Scott is gay. He has talked about having struggled with his sexuality when growing up, but has gained confidence since becoming an adult.

=== Charity ===
Scott is a proponent of mental health awareness and suicide prevention. In 2020, he performed live in support of Mind for Mental Health Awareness, donating all proceeds to Mind.

== Discography ==
- Only Human (2018)
- Bridges (2022)
- Avenoir (2025)

== Tours ==
Headlining

- North American Tour (2016–2017)
- Only Human Tour (2018)
- Bridges World Tour (2022)
- The Avenoir Tour (2025–2026)

Supporting act

- Jamie Lawson UK Tour (2016) (Jamie Lawson)
- PTX Summer Tour 2018 (2018) (Pentatonix)
- 2Sides World Tour (2018) (Jason Derulo)
- Tales From The Script: Greatest Hits (2022) (The Script)
- +–=÷× Tour (2024) (Ed Sheeran)
- Take That TBA Tour (2024) (Take That)

== Awards and nominations ==
Year	Award	Category	Work	Result
2015	National Reality Television Awards	"Best Performance"	Britain's Got Talent	Nominated
2017	Brit Awards	"British Single of the Year"	Dancing on My Own	Nominated
2018	British LGBT Awards	"Metro Guilty Pleasures Award"	Himself	Won
