= Jon Maguire =

Welsh songwriter

- Born: 1988 (age 37–38); United Kingdom
- Origin: Blackwood, Caerphilly, Wales
- Occupations: Songwriter, record producer
- Labels: Warner Bros. Records, Virgin EMI, B-Unique Records

Jon "MAGS" Maguire is a Welsh songwriter and record producer. He has appeared on over twenty UK top 40 records, including four number one albums. He is best known for writing "You Are The Reason" with Calum Scott, "Brother" with Kodaline and "Whistle" with Jax Jones. Jon has written and produced for artists including Kodaline, Scouting For Girls, Christina Perri, Calum Scott, You Me At Six, Tiesto, Sam Feldt, Leona Lewis, Rita Ora, Jax Jones, Tom Chaplin, The Vamps,Lost Frequencies, Aloe Blacc and Armin van Buuren.

In November 2022 Simon Cowell announced on Facebook and Maguire announced on Instagram that Cowell had acquired a catalogue of his songs that included You Are The Reason.
